= Otto von Stetten =

Otto von Stetten (16 March 1862 – 7 August 1937) was a German General of the Cavalry in World War I.

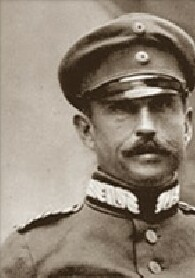
Otto von Stetten (1862–1937)

== Family background ==
Otto was the son of the Bavarian Kammerjunker Friedrich von Stetten and his wife Adele (née Hohe). In 1915, he married Marie, Baroness von Weinbach.

== Military career ==
=== Peacetime career ===
Having completed his secondary education, Stetten joined the 3rd Royal Bavarian Chevau-légers "Herzog Karl Theodor" of the Bavarian Army in Dieuze as a Four-year volunteer. On 18 March 1880, he was promoted to Fähnrich and on 29 April 1882 he became second lieutenant. Stetten then received training at the Riding School in Munich between 1889 and 1891 and at the Bavarian War Academy in the three years up to 1894. In the meantime, he had been promoted to first lieutenant on 25 March 1891 and on 4 April 1895 was seconded to the General Staff for a year. For the following three and a half years, Stetten served as the personal aide to Rupprecht, Crown Prince of Bavaria. Together, the two undertook extensive travels to the Middle East, India, Japan and China. In this function, on 7 November 1896, Stetten was promoted to Rittmeister. As such, he assumed command of a Squadron of the 2nd Royal Bavarian Chevau-légers "Taxis" on 6 November 1899, then stationed in Regensburg. Then, on 13 September 1901, Stetten was again assigned to the General Staff of the 2nd Royal Bavarian Division based in Augsburg, and on 28 October 1902 he was promoted to the senior rank of major.

In 1904, Stetten applied for leave of absence and shortly after, he was granted permission to take part in the Russo-Japanese War on the side of the Empire of Japan, where he also fought in the 1905 Battle of Mukden, the most decisive major land battle of the entire conflict. At the time, his participation in the war was even noted by the Munich town chronicle.

After the war had ended, Stetten returned to Bavaria on 17 September 1905 and on 17 October of the same year he was appointed Chief of Staff of the I Royal Bavarian Corps. Following his promotion to Oberstleutnant on 15 August 1906, he assumed command of the 2nd Royal Bavarian Heavy Cavalry "Archduke Francis Ferdinand of Austria" on 12 July 1908. This was a heavy cavalry regiment with its peacetime location at Landshut. Precisely one month later, on 12 August 1908, Stetten was promoted to colonel. On 26 March 1909, he was appointed commander of the 5th Royal Bavarian Cavalry Brigade and a year later of the 1st Royal Bavarian Cavalry Brigade. After his promotion to Generalmajor on 16 October 1911, Stetten became Undersecretary in the recently founded Bavarian Ministry of War and at the same time was appointed Bavarian Counsellor of State, thus becoming a close advisor of Otto of Bavaria. Between 18 March 1913 and 1 August 1914 he further served as inspector of the Bavarian Cavalry. In this function, Stetten directly reported to the German Emperor Wilhelm II. On 17 December 1913, he was promoted to Generalleutnant.

=== Wartime career ===
At the outbreak of the First World War, Stetten was appointed the new commander of the Bavarian Cavalry Division, a key tactical formation of the German 6th Army employed on the Western Front. On 11 August 1914, the division was already involved in combat operations near Lagarde. Although the Uhlans of the division lost 235 soldiers, the village of Lagarde was successfully taken by assault. As a result, the division was able to capture a French flag, eleven units of heavy weaponry, six machine guns and 1400 prisoners. Perhaps most importantly, Stetten could seize documents from a fallen brigadier general revealing crucial information about the French plan of action for Lorraine. The encounter at Lagarde was the last successful large-scale cavalry attack on the Western Front.

In October, the division was engaged in the border region of northern France and Belgium and already managed to advance on Hazebrouck, when it had to be taken back because of the advance of British troops. On 11 October 1914, Stetten was awarded the Knight's Cross of the Military Order of Max Joseph. On 5 November 1914, he was assigned to the temporary command of the II Royal Bavarian Corps to deputize for General Karl Ritter von Martini. Five days later, on 10 November 1914, the Corps managed to capture Sint-Elooi during the First Battle of Ypres. During the Battle of the Somme, some positions of the 3rd Royal Bavarian Division were overrun by the enemy. At the same time, the 4th Royal Bavarian Division was able to decelerate the Allied Capture of Martinpuich with machine gun fire. For his leadership, Stetten was awarded the Pour le Mérite on 22 September 1916.

On 5 January 1917, Stetten officially took over the Corps as Commanding General (CG) and was promoted to General of the Cavalry. At this time he commanded the 3rd Royal Bavarian Division under Generalleutnant Karl von Wenninger and the 4th Royal Bavarian Division under Generalmajor Prince Franz of Bavaria.

During the Battle of Passchendaele, the Corps was assigned to the southern section of the front of the 4th Army as group "Lille" and was able to hold its positions.

On the morning of 21 May 1917, the British Second Army initiated the Battle of Messines (1917) with a massive bombardment with over 2,000 canons. Although destroying the majority of Germany's defence facilities in this sector, the bombardment also warned Stetten of a potential imminent large-scale attack. The kind of attack, however, had not been foreseen by Stetten and his staff. The British began their attack on 7 June with the detonation of 19 mines they had deployed below the German front line. At the time, the detonation was the loudest sound so far created by humans and still is one of the largest non-nuclear explosions of all times. The explosion immediately killed up to 10,000 of Stetten's soldiers belonging to the 3rd Royal Bavarian Division. Using barrage, toxic gas and 72 tanks, British units managed to make extensive advances into the German defence lines and capture thousands of German soldiers. Without doubt, the Battle of Messines (1917) was one of the most successful Allied advances of World War I and Stetten's greatest defeat.

For the Battle of the Lys (1918), Stetten was assigned the central attacking position. Furthermore, his task force also included the 10th Ersatz-Division, the 32nd Division and the 38th Division. The right wing of Stetten's formation succeeded in capturing the forest of Grenier and the village of Fleurbaix, while also establishing access to the Lys river at Bac St. Maur. This area could then be used by other units to cross the river when parts of his units were still engaged in heavy fighting at Pont Mortier. The Corps then further advanced, culminating in the capture of the city of Armentières. The successes of this battle outweighed the 1917 losses in Flanders and created a basis for further advancements. The Allies had to take heavy losses in the form of 20,000 prisoners, 400 canons and thousands of machine guns.

Konrad Krafft von Dellmensingen replaced Stetten on 18 April 1918. He retired from active service on 12 May 1918. At the same time, Ludwig III of Bavaria awarded him the Commander's Cross of the Military Order of Max Joseph to honour his achievements.

The 3rd Royal Bavarian Division and the 4th Royal Bavarian Division, both de facto under Stetten's command since the end of 1914, were recognized as outstanding units by the Allies. Regarding the 3rd Royal Bavarian Division, Allied intelligence rated the division as one of the best German divisions. In the same way, the 4th Royal Bavarian Division was seen as first class and of the highest quality.

== Decorations and awards ==
A barracks in Munich was named after Otto von Stetten in 1938 in recognition of his military valour. Furthermore, Stetten held the following awards:

- The Order of the Rising Sun, Gold Rays with Rosette awarded on 19 February 1906
- Merit Order of the Bavarian Crown, Commander's Cross awarded in 1913
- Order of St. Michael, 4th Class with Crown and Swords
- Order of the Red Eagle, 2nd Class
- Order of the Crown, 4th Class
- Iron Cross, 2nd Class awarded on 13 October 1914
- Iron Cross, 1st Class awarded on 14 November 1914
- Military Merit Order, Grand Cross with Swords awarded on 21 October 1915
- Albert Order, Grand Cross with Swords
- Pour le Merite awarded on 22 September 1916

== Literature ==
- Rudolf von Kramer, Otto von Waldenfels: VIRTUTI PRO PATRIA. Der königlich bayerische Militär-Max-Joseph-Orden. Kriegstaten und Ehrenbuch 1914-1918. Selbstverlag des königlich bayerischen Militär-Max-Joseph-Ordens, München 1966, S. 419–420.
- Karl-Friedrich Hildebrand, Christian Zweng: Die Ritter des Ordens Pour le Mérite des I. Weltkriegs. Band 3: P-Z. Biblio Verlag. Bissendorf 2011. ISBN 3-7648-2586-3. S. 360–361.
- Hanns Möller: Geschichte des Ritter des Ordens »pour le mérite« im Weltkrieg. Band II: M–Z. Verlag Bernard & Graefe, Berlin 1935, S. 373–374.
