= Bavarian Cavalry Division =

Bavarian Cavalry Division (Bayerische Kavallerie-Division)
- Flag of the Staff of a Division (1871–1918)
- Active: 2 August 1914-1919
- Disbanded: 1919
- Country: Bavaria / German Empire
- Branch: Army
- Type: Cavalry
- Size: Approximately 5,000 (on mobilisation)
- Engagements: World War I

The Bavarian Cavalry Division (Bayerische Kavallerie-Division) was a unit of the Royal Bavarian Army, part of the German Army, in World War I. (Note: From the late 1800s, the Prussian Army was effectively the German Army as, during the period of German unification (1866-1871), the states of the German Empire entered into conventions with Prussia regarding their armies. Only the Bavarian Army remained fully autonomous and came under Prussian control only during wartime.) The division was formed on the mobilization of the German Army in August 1914. The division was disbanded in 1919, during the demobilization of the German Army after World War I. The division was raised and recruited in Bavaria.

== Combat chronicle ==
=== Western Front ===
The formation of the division was quickly completed after mobilization. In addition to the three cavalry brigades, the divisional troops included hunters, cyclists, machine gun troops, mounted artillery and engineers. On 4 August 1914, Lieutenant General Otto von Stetten took command of the division.

The division's deployment area was south-east of Metz, where it was grouped together with the Prussian 7th Cavalry Division and 8th Cavalry Division (Royal Saxon) under the Higher Cavalry Commander's Army Cavalry. With parts of the Prussian XXI Corps deployed to protect the right flank of the I Corps, the division received its baptism of fire on 11 August 1914 in the Battle of Lagarde. The division's Uhlans overran the French artillery positions in a bold attack but were repelled by French infantry during the storming of Lagarde with heavy losses. The hunters of the divisional troops and parts of the 131st (2nd Lorraine) Infantry Regiment were able to take the village. 1,500 prisoners, eight artillery pieces and six machine guns as well as a flag fell into the hands of the attackers.

After the Battle of Lorraine, the division was used as a reserve during the French counterattack off Nancy-Épinal. In October 1914, the division fought under the Cavalry Corps "Hollen" (H.K.K. 4) in the border area of northern France and Belgium and was already able to advance to Hazebrouck when it was withdrawn because of advancing British troops. During the First Battle of Ypres from 30 October – 24 November 1914, Lieutenant General Karl von Wenninger took over the division on 5 November 1914 as Lieutenant General Stetten was given command of the II Corps in the 6th Army. After the fighting at Ypres, the division went to the Belgian hinterland to rest, then to the vicinity of the fortifications of Metz.

=== Eastern Front ===
On 6 March 1915, Generalleutnant Philipp von Hellingrath took over the division. The cavalry division, which had meanwhile been transferred to the Eastern Front, launched a diversionary attack from Tilsit on 26 April 1915 in the direction of Šiauliai and Liepāja. They advanced to the Vilnius-Šiauliai railway line without flank protection, blew up the tracks and, as ordered, returned to the Dubysa near Kelmė on 11 May 1915. There they stood for the following two months in fierce defensive battles against Russian patrol units and created the conditions for General von Hindenburg's planned large-scale attack on Kaunas and Vilnius. The division, deployed on the southern flank of the Njemen Army, advanced more than 100 km from 22 July – 27 July 1915, but was pinched and thrown back by two Russian cavalry divisions at Subačius. In August, it made a bold move towards Ukmergė, inflicting heavy casualties on the attacking Russian forces. During the attack on Minsk via Vilnius, the division on the right wing of the Njemen Army was supposed to throw the enemy north of the Ukmergė-Daugavpils road, but in September 1915 it received orders to advance in a south-easterly direction behind the enemy. The Russian troops had already given way and were counterattacking on the Vilija with strong infantry forces. On 25 September 1915, the division sealed off a break-in at the Prussian 4th Cavalry Division at Dolhinow. It was then taken back to the Vidzy area south of Daugavpils, where it remained buried in its positions until 1916. At Stochod near Toboly, the division had to resist heavy attacks by Russian troops during the Brusilov offensive in August and September 1916.

After Generalleutnant Hellingrath took over the War Ministry, Major General Moritz von und zu Egloffstein was entrusted with the leadership of the division on 14 December 1916. Meanwhile moved to Galicia, the division took part in the attack on Tarnopol from 19 July – 5 August 1917. At Stanislau, together with the 8th Reserve Division, they prevented a breakthrough of Russian forces at the beginning of the battle. From 23 July 1917, the division started the pursuit up to the eastern border of Galicia. Russian resistance was broken. After the Treaty of Brest-Litovsk, the division advanced to Nikolayev in 1918 and on to the Crimea. In June the staff with the 5th Cavalry Brigade was transferred to western Volhynia and remained there until the withdrawal in early 1919.

== Order of Battle on mobilisation ==
On formation, in August 1914, the component units of the division were:

- 1st Bavarian Cavalry Brigade (from I Bavarian Corps District)
  - 1st Royal Bavarian Heavy Cavalry "Prince Charles of Bavaria"
  - 2nd Royal Bavarian Heavy Cavalry "Archduke Francis Ferdinand of Austria"
- 4th Bavarian Cavalry Brigade (from II Bavarian Corps District)
  - 1st Royal Bavarian Uhlans "Emperor William II, King of Prussia"
  - 2nd Royal Bavarian Uhlans "King"
- 5th Bavarian Cavalry Brigade (from III Bavarian Corps District)
  - 1st Royal Bavarian Chevau-légers "Emperor Nicholas of Russia"
  - 6th Royal Bavarian Chevau-légers "Prince Albrecht of Prussia"
- Horse Artillery Abteilung of the 5th Royal Bavarian Field Artillery "King Alfons XIII of Spain" Regiment
- 1st Bavarian Cavalry Machine Gun Detachment
- Bavarian Cavalry Pioneer Detachment
- Bavarian Cavalry Signals Detachment
  - Bavarian Light Wireless Station 1
  - Bavarian Light Wireless Station 2
  - Bavarian Heavy Wireless Station 3
  - Bavarian Heavy Wireless Station 4
- Bavarian Cavalry Motorised Vehicle Column 1

See: Table of Organisation and Equipment

== Late World War I organization ==
From 25 November 1917 to 21 March 1918, the division was without any cavalry; and from 20 April 1918, it only had two Cavalry Brigades.

- 4th Bavarian Cavalry Brigade became independent on 3 July 1917

Allied Intelligence rated the Division as 4th Class (of 4). The organisation in 1918 was:

- 1st Bavarian Cavalry Brigade
  - 1st Royal Bavarian Heavy Cavalry "Prince Charles of Bavaria"
  - 2nd Royal Bavarian Heavy Cavalry "Archduke Francis Ferdinand of Austria"
- 5th Bavarian Cavalry Brigade
  - 1st Royal Bavarian Chevau-légers "Emperor Nicholas of Russia"
  - 6th Royal Bavarian Chevau-légers "Prince Albrecht of Prussia"
- Horse Artillery Abteilung of the 5th Royal Bavarian Field Artillery "King Alfons XIII of Spain" Regiment
- 1st Bavarian Cavalry Machine Gun Detachment
- Bavarian Cavalry Pioneer Detachment
- Bavarian Cavalry Cyclist Detachment
- 30th Bavarian Ambulance Company
- Attached
  - Landsturm Infantry Battalion Glatz (VI/9) (Note: Landsturm Infantry Battalion Glatz (VI/9) was raised in the town of Glatz, Lower Silesia; it was the 9th Landsturm Infantry Battalion from the VI Corps District.)

== See also ==
- Bavarian Army
- German Army (German Empire)
- German cavalry in World War I
- German Army order of battle (1914)

== Bibliography ==
- Cron, Hermann (2002). Imperial German Army 1914-18: Organisation, Structure, Orders-of-Battle [first published: 1937]. Helion & Co. ISBN 1-874622-70-1.
- Ellis, John; Cox, Michael (1993). The World War I Databook. Aurum Press Ltd. ISBN 1-85410-766-6.
- Histories of Two Hundred and Fifty-One Divisions of the German Army which Participated in the War (1914-1918), compiled from records of Intelligence section of the General Staff, American Expeditionary Forces, at General Headquarters, Chaumont, France 1919. The London Stamp Exchange Ltd. 1989 [1920]. ISBN 0-948130-87-3.
- The German Forces in the Field; 7th Revision, 11th November 1918; Compiled by the General Staff, War Office. Imperial War Museum, London and the Battery Press. 1995 [1918]. ISBN 978-1-870423-95-3.
