= Battle of Lagarde (1914) =

1914 World War I battle near Lagarde, France

The Battle of Lagarde took place on August 11, 1914, during World War I and was one of the last battles in military history to feature a large-scale cavalry charge at the brigade level.

== Background ==
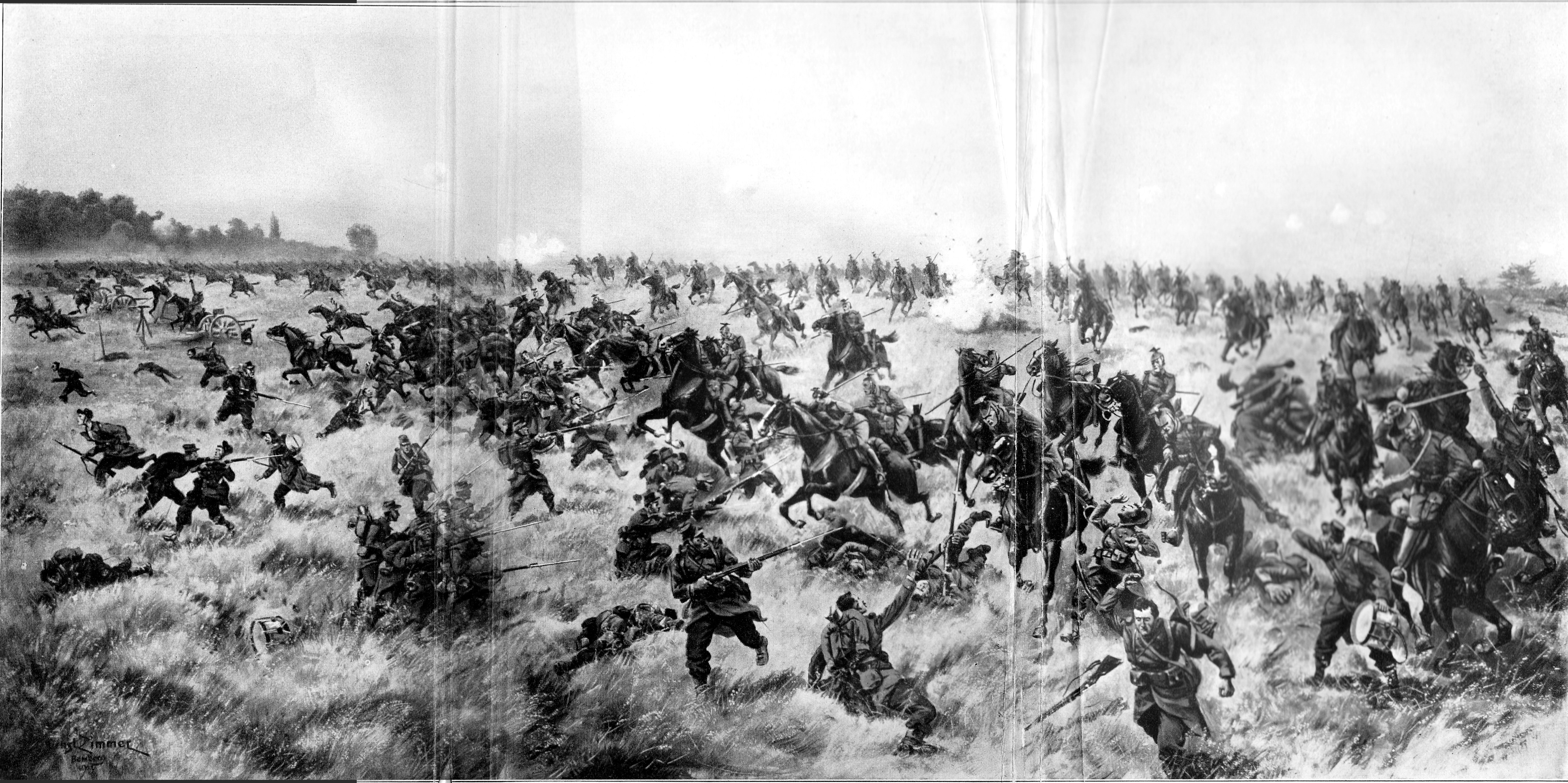
The Bavarian Cavalry Division during the Attack on Lagarde, August 11, 1914.

In early August 1914, the Bavarian Cavalry Division, serving as army cavalry, probed the well-entrenched French border defenses in Lorraine during the initial deployment on the Western Front. The Bavarian Uhlan Brigade, consisting of the 1st Uhlan Regiment and the 2nd Uhlan Regiment, part of the Bavarian Cavalry Division, had to march back and forth across Lorraine between August 6 and 10 without finding a gap in the French lines. The hard roads took a severe toll on the horses.

On August 10, the French became active and managed to capture the village of Lagarde (known as Gerden from 1871 to 1918) near the border in the German part of Lorraine. To counter this, Lieutenant General Otto von Stetten, commander of the Bavarian Cavalry Division, and Lieutenant General Hasso von Bredow, leader of the 42nd Infantry Division, decided to conduct a forceful reconnaissance against Lagarde on August 11.

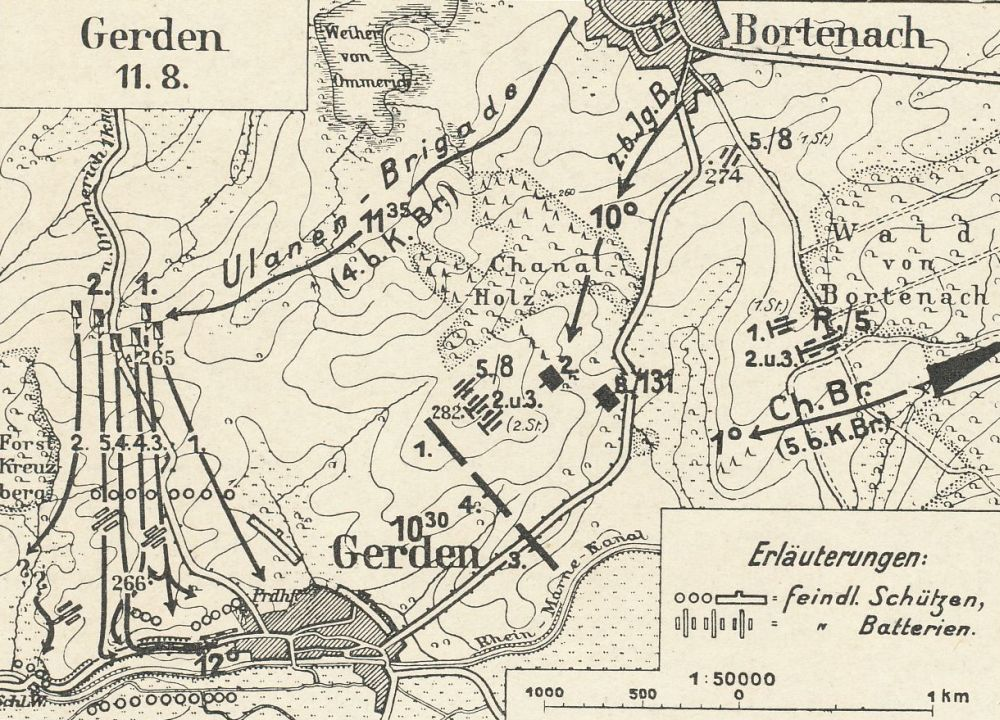
Map of the Battle at Lagarde on August 11, 1914.

== Results ==
The Germans captured eleven guns, several machine guns, and 1,400 prisoners. A fallen French brigadier general was found with a two-day-old army order revealing the French battle plan in Lorraine. The Bavarian Uhlan Brigade lost 16 officers, 219 soldiers, and 304 horses.
