= Karl von Wenninger =

German military officer

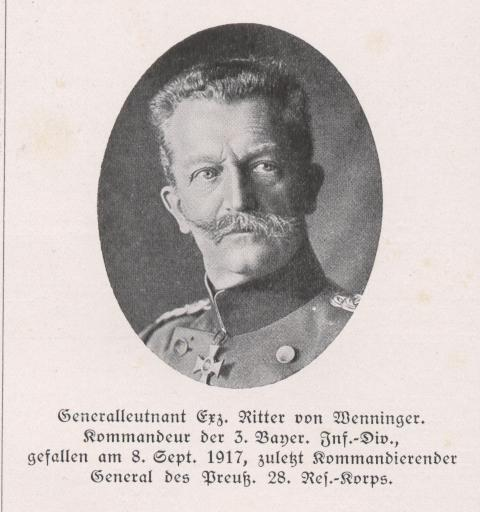
- Born: 13 August 1861; Berg ob Landshut, Lower Bavaria, Kingdom of Bavaria
- Died: 8 September 1917 (aged 56); Muncelu, Străoane, Vrancea County, Romania
- Military career
- Allegiance: Kingdom of Bavaria; German Empire
- Branch: Bavarian Army; Imperial German Army
- Service years: 1882–1917
- Rank: Lieutenant General
- Commands: Bavarian Cavalry Division; 3rd Royal Bavarian Division; XVIII Reserve Corps
- Conflicts: World War I: First Battle of Ypres; Third Battle of Artois; Battle of the Somme; Battle of Arras; Battle of Mărășești †
- Awards: Military Order of Max Joseph; Pour le Merite

Karl Ritter von Wenninger (born Karl Wenninger; 13 August 1861 – 8 September 1917) was a German lieutenant general who commanded the XVIII Reserve Corps in World War I.

== Biography ==
=== Family ===
Wenninger was the son of Bavarian colonel Franz Xaver Wenninger and his wife Mathilde, née Forster.

Wenninger married Kornelie Prins on July 11, 1889, in Landshut. She was the daughter of Ary Prins, the vice-president of the Council for the Dutch East Indies. The marriage resulted in a daughter and two sons. Both sons pursued military careers like their father. Their younger son was killed in action in 1917 while serving as a pilot on the Western Front. Their elder son, Ralph, initially served in the Imperial German Navy as a submarine commander and eventually achieved the rank of Luftwaffe general in World War II. Like his father, Ralph was awarded the Pour le Mérite during the First World War. Outside of princely families, they are the only father and son to have both received Prussia's highest award for valor.

=== Military career ===
After graduating from a humanistic Gymnasium on 28 September 1880, he enlisted in the 2nd Bavarian Heavy Cavalry Regiment as part of the Bavarian Army in Landshut. He was then made an ensign on March 29, 1881, and promoted to second lieutenant on November 23, 1882. From October 1, 1888, to September 30, 1891, Wenninger studied at the War Academy, which qualified him for the higher adjutantage and, secondarily, for the general staff. He was subsequently assigned to the equitation institute, where he was promoted to premier lieutenant. That October, he was transferred to the staff of the 2nd Cavalry Brigade in Augsburg as an adjutant. From September 24, 1895, Wenninger served on the general staff for three years, meanwhile being promoted to captain on October 28, 1897. He then completed a year-long assignment on the staff of the I Royal Bavarian Corps before returning to line duty as a company commander in the 5th Chevaulegers Regiment. Afterwards, he served a tour on the staff of the 3rd Royal Bavarian Division in Landau. Beginning on 21 September 1902, Wenninger worked for two years as a teacher of military history and the history of the art of war at the War Academy. He was promoted to major on 23 October 1903, and subsequently transferred back to the staff of the I Bavarian Corps. On 19 April 1906, he became a member of the War Academy's study commission and was entrusted with the leadership of the 1st Bavarian Heavy Cavalry Regiment. Wenninger was formally appointed regimental commander on 20 July 1906, and was later promoted to lieutenant colonel on 8 March 1907, and colonel on 7 March 1909. As such, he took command of the 6th Cavalry Brigade in Regensburg on September 24, 1909. He was appointed to the Great General Staff in Berlin on December 15, 1911, serving as Bavarian Military Representative. Here, he was also Bavaria's deputy representative on the Federal Council. Wenninger was promoted to major general on March 7, 1912.

When World War I broke out, he initially remained the Bavarian military representative as part of the Great Headquarters. In recognition of his services, Wenninger was awarded the Knight's Cross of the Order of Merit of the Bavarian Crown on September 27, 1914. This award elevated him to personal nobility status, and he was permitted to assume the title Ritter von Wenninger upon his enrollment in the nobility register.

After his promotion to lieutenant general on September 10, 1914, Wenninger became commander of the Bavarian Cavalry Division on November 7, 1914. He led the unit in the First Battle of Ypres and the subsequent trench warfare in Flanders. In March 1915, Wenninger took over command of the 3rd Royal Bavarian Division in Artois. In September and October, the division was able to prevent multiple breakthrough attempts during the battles taking place near La Bassée and Arras. During the Battle of the Somme, the division defended the Martinpuich section of the Foureaux Forest. In April 1917, the division was on the Arras front south of the Scarpe. During the Battle of Arras, Wenninger succeeded in repelling three attacks by the British and stabilized his front sector.

For this achievement, King Ludwig III rewarded Wenninger with the Knight's Cross of the Military Order of Max Joseph on April 23, 1917. Shortly thereafter, Wilhelm II awarded him the Pour le Mérite on May 1, 1917.

On June 5, 1917, he was appointed commander of the XVIII Reserve Corps, which at the time was in front of Verdun. The corps was transferred to the Romanian Front in July and took part in the German summer offensive in August and September. During the breakthrough battles of Putna and Susita, his troops succeeded in capturing Muncelul. Wenninger was killed in the Battle of Mărășești on September 8, 1917.
