= II Royal Bavarian Corps =

Military unit

II Royal Bavarian Army Corps II. Königlich Bayerische Armee-Korps
- Flag of the Staff of a Generalkommando (1871–1918)
- Active: 1869–1919
- Country: Bavaria / German Empire
- Type: Corps
- Size: Approximately 44,000 (on mobilisation in 1914)
- Garrison/HQ: Würzburg/Ludwig-Straße 25
- Patron: King of Bavaria
- Engagements: Franco-Prussian War Battle of Wissembourg (1870) Battle of Wörth (1870) Battle of Sedan Siege of Paris World War I Battle of the Frontiers

Insignia
- Abbreviation: II Bavarian AK

The II Royal Bavarian Army Corps / II Bavarian AK (German: II. Königlich Bayerisches Armee-Korps) was a corps level command of the Royal Bavarian Army, part of the Imperial German Army, before and during World War I. (Note: From the late 1800s, the Prussian Army was effectively the German Army as, during the period of German unification (1866–1871), the states of the German Empire entered into conventions with Prussia regarding their armies. Only the Bavarian Army remained fully autonomous and came under Prussian control only during wartime.)

As part of the 1868 army reform, the II Royal Bavarian Army Corps of the Bavarian Army was set up in 1869 in Würzburg as the Generalkommando (headquarters) for the northern part of the kingdom. With the formation of the III Royal Bavarian Corps in 1900 it was made responsible for Lower Franconia, parts of Upper Franconia and the Palatinate. Like all Bavarian formations, it was assigned to the IV Army Inspectorate which became the 6th Army at the start of the First World War. The Corps was disbanded at the end of the war.

== Franco-Prussian War ==
The II Royal Bavarian Corps (along with the I Royal Bavarian Corps) participated in the Franco-Prussian War as part of the 3rd Army. It saw action in the battles of Wissembourg, Wörth and Sedan, and in the Siege of Paris.

== Peacetime organisation ==
The 25 peacetime Corps of the German Army (Guards, I - XXI, I - III Bavarian) had a reasonably standardised organisation. Each consisted of two divisions with usually two infantry brigades, one field artillery brigade and a cavalry brigade each. Each brigade normally consisted of two regiments of the appropriate type, so each Corps normally commanded 8 infantry, 4 field artillery and 4 cavalry regiments. There were exceptions to this rule:

V, VI, VII, IX and XIV Corps each had a 5th infantry brigade (so 10 infantry regiments)
II, XIII, XVIII and XXI Corps had a 9th infantry regiment
I, VI and XVI Corps had a 3rd cavalry brigade (so 6 cavalry regiments)
the Guards Corps had 11 infantry regiments (in 5 brigades) and 8 cavalry regiments (in 4 brigades).

Each Corps also directly controlled a number of other units. This could include one or more

Foot Artillery Regiment
Jäger Battalion
Pioneer Battalion
Train Battalion

Peacetime organization of the Corps
Corps	Division	Brigade	Units	Garrison
II Royal Bavarian Corps	3rd Royal Bavarian Division	5th Bavarian Infantry Brigade	22nd Royal Bavarian Infantry "Prince William of Hohenzollern"	Zweibrücken, II Bn. Saargemünd
II Royal Bavarian Corps	3rd Royal Bavarian Division	5th Bavarian Infantry Brigade	23rd Royal Bavarian Infantry	Landau, II Bn. Germersheim, III Bn. Lechfeld
II Royal Bavarian Corps	3rd Royal Bavarian Division	6th Bavarian Infantry Brigade	17th Royal Bavarian Infantry "Orff"	Germersheim
II Royal Bavarian Corps	3rd Royal Bavarian Division	6th Bavarian Infantry Brigade	18th Royal Bavarian Infantry "Prince Ludwig Ferdinand"	Landau
II Royal Bavarian Corps	3rd Royal Bavarian Division	3rd Bavarian Field Artillery Brigade	5th Royal Bavarian Field Artillery "King Alfons XIII of Spain"	Landau
II Royal Bavarian Corps	3rd Royal Bavarian Division	3rd Bavarian Field Artillery Brigade	12th Royal Bavarian Field Artillery	Landau
II Royal Bavarian Corps	3rd Royal Bavarian Division	3rd Bavarian Cavalry Brigade	3rd Royal Bavarian Chevau-légers "Duke Charles Theodore"	Dieuze
II Royal Bavarian Corps	3rd Royal Bavarian Division	3rd Bavarian Cavalry Brigade	5th Royal Bavarian Chevau-légers "Archduke Albrecht of Austria"	Saargemünd
II Royal Bavarian Corps	4th Royal Bavarian Division	7th Bavarian Infantry Brigade	5th Royal Bavarian Infantry "Grand Duke Ernst Ludwig of Hessen"	Bamberg
II Royal Bavarian Corps	4th Royal Bavarian Division	7th Bavarian Infantry Brigade	9th Royal Bavarian Infantry "Wrede"	Würzburg
II Royal Bavarian Corps	4th Royal Bavarian Division	8th Bavarian Infantry Brigade	4th Royal Bavarian Infantry "King William of Württemberg"	Metz
II Royal Bavarian Corps	4th Royal Bavarian Division	8th Bavarian Infantry Brigade	8th Royal Bavarian Infantry "Grand Duke Frederick II of Baden"	Metz
II Royal Bavarian Corps	4th Royal Bavarian Division	4th Bavarian Field Artillery Brigade	2nd Royal Bavarian Field Artillery "Horn"	Würzburg
II Royal Bavarian Corps	4th Royal Bavarian Division	4th Bavarian Field Artillery Brigade	11th Royal Bavarian Field Artillery	Würzburg
II Royal Bavarian Corps	4th Royal Bavarian Division	4th Bavarian Cavalry Brigade	1st Royal Bavarian Uhlans "Emperor William II, King of Prussia"	Bamberg
II Royal Bavarian Corps	4th Royal Bavarian Division	4th Bavarian Cavalry Brigade	2nd Royal Bavarian Uhlans "King"	Ansbach
II Royal Bavarian Corps	Corps Troops		2nd Royal Bavarian Jäger Battalion	Aschaffenburg
II Royal Bavarian Corps	Corps Troops		1st Royal Bavarian Machine Gun Abteilung	Landau
II Royal Bavarian Corps	Corps Troops		2nd Royal Bavarian Foot Artillery	Metz
II Royal Bavarian Corps	Corps Troops		2nd Royal Bavarian Pioneer Battalion	Speyer
II Royal Bavarian Corps	Corps Troops		3rd Royal Bavarian Pioneer Battalion	Munich
II Royal Bavarian Corps	Corps Troops		2nd Royal Bavarian Train Abteilung	Würzburg, Germersheim
II Royal Bavarian Corps	Landau Defence Command (Landwehr-Inspektion)			Landau

== World War I ==
=== Organisation on mobilisation ===
On mobilization on 2 August 1914 the Corps was restructured. 4th Cavalry Brigade was withdrawn to form part of the Bavarian Cavalry Division and the 3rd Cavalry Brigade was broken up and its regiments assigned to the divisions as reconnaissance units. Divisions received engineer companies and other support units from the Corps headquarters.

The 8th Bavarian Infantry Brigade (4th and 8th Bavarian Infantry Regiments) remained in Metz as part of the 33rd Reserve Division on mobilisation. It was replaced in 4th Bavarian Division by the 5th Bavarian Reserve Infantry Brigade (5th and 8th Bavarian Reserve Infantry Regiments).

In summary, II Bavarian Corps mobilised with 25 infantry battalions, 8 machine gun companies (48 machine guns), 8 cavalry squadrons, 24 field artillery batteries (144 guns), 4 heavy artillery batteries (16 guns), 3 pioneer companies and an aviation detachment.

Initial wartime organization of the Corps
Corps	Division	Brigade	Units
II Royal Bavarian Corps	3rd Royal Bavarian Division	5th Bavarian Infantry Brigade	22nd Bavarian Infantry Regiment
II Royal Bavarian Corps	3rd Royal Bavarian Division	5th Bavarian Infantry Brigade	23rd Bavarian Infantry Regiment
II Royal Bavarian Corps	3rd Royal Bavarian Division	6th Bavarian Infantry Brigade	17th Bavarian Infantry Regiment
II Royal Bavarian Corps	3rd Royal Bavarian Division	6th Bavarian Infantry Brigade	18th Bavarian Infantry Regiment
II Royal Bavarian Corps	3rd Royal Bavarian Division	3rd Bavarian Field Artillery Brigade	5th Bavarian Field Artillery Regiment
II Royal Bavarian Corps	3rd Royal Bavarian Division	3rd Bavarian Field Artillery Brigade	12th Bavarian Field Artillery Regiment
II Royal Bavarian Corps	3rd Royal Bavarian Division		3rd Chevauleger Regiment
II Royal Bavarian Corps	3rd Royal Bavarian Division		1st Company, 2nd Bavarian Pioneer Battalion
II Royal Bavarian Corps	3rd Royal Bavarian Division		3rd Company, 2nd Bavarian Pioneer Battalion
II Royal Bavarian Corps	3rd Royal Bavarian Division		3rd Bavarian Divisional Pontoon Train
II Royal Bavarian Corps	3rd Royal Bavarian Division		1st Bavarian Medical Company
II Royal Bavarian Corps	3rd Royal Bavarian Division		3rd Bavarian Medical Company
II Royal Bavarian Corps	4th Royal Bavarian Division	7th Bavarian Infantry Brigade	5th Bavarian Infantry Regiment
II Royal Bavarian Corps	4th Royal Bavarian Division	7th Bavarian Infantry Brigade	9th Bavarian Infantry Regiment
II Royal Bavarian Corps	4th Royal Bavarian Division	7th Bavarian Infantry Brigade	2nd Bavarian Jäger Battalion
II Royal Bavarian Corps	4th Royal Bavarian Division	5th Bavarian Reserve Infantry Brigade	5th Bavarian Reserve Infantry Regiment
II Royal Bavarian Corps	4th Royal Bavarian Division	5th Bavarian Reserve Infantry Brigade	8th Bavarian Reserve Infantry Regiment
II Royal Bavarian Corps	4th Royal Bavarian Division	4th Bavarian Field Artillery Brigade	2nd Bavarian Field Artillery Regiment
II Royal Bavarian Corps	4th Royal Bavarian Division	4th Bavarian Field Artillery Brigade	11th Bavarian Field Artillery Regiment
II Royal Bavarian Corps	4th Royal Bavarian Division		5th Chevauleger Regiment
II Royal Bavarian Corps	4th Royal Bavarian Division		2nd Company, 2nd Bavarian Pioneer Battalion
II Royal Bavarian Corps	4th Royal Bavarian Division		4th Bavarian Divisional Pontoon Train
II Royal Bavarian Corps	4th Royal Bavarian Division		2nd Bavarian Medical Company
II Royal Bavarian Corps	Corps Troops		I Battalion, 1st Bavarian Foot Artillery Regiment
II Royal Bavarian Corps	Corps Troops		2nd Bavarian Aviation Detachment
II Royal Bavarian Corps	Corps Troops		2nd Bavarian Corps Pontoon Train
II Royal Bavarian Corps	Corps Troops		2nd Bavarian Telephone Detachment
II Royal Bavarian Corps	Corps Troops		2nd Bavarian Pioneer Searchlight Section
II Royal Bavarian Corps	Corps Troops		Munition Trains and Columns corresponding to II Corps

=== Combat chronicle ===
On mobilisation, II Royal Bavarian Corps was assigned to the predominantly Bavarian 6th Army forming part of the left wing of the forces for the Schlieffen Plan offensive in August 1914. It was still in existence at the end of the war in the 17th Army, Heeresgruppe Kronprinz Rupprecht on the Western Front.

== Commanders ==
The II Royal Bavarian Corps had the following commanders during its existence:

Dates	Rank	Name
8 January 1869	General der Infanterie	Jakob Freiherr von Hartmann
24 April 1873	Generalleutnant	Joseph von Maillinger
5 July 1875	General der Infanterie	Carl von Orff
9 May 1890	General der Infanterie	Otto von Parseval
18 April 1895	General der Kavallerie	Emil Ritter von Xylander
23 March 1905	General der Infanterie	Theophil Freiherr Reichlin von Meldegg
18 November 1908	General der Infanterie	Alfred Graf Eckbrett von Dürckheim-Montmartin
22 April 1912	General der Infanterie	Karl Ritter von Martini
5 November 1914	Generalleutnant	Otto von Stetten
19 April 1918	General der Infanterie	Konrad Krafft von Dellmensingen
20 December 1918	Generalleutnant	Otto Ritter von Rauchenberger
10 June 1919	General der Artillerie	Hermann Ritter von Burkhardt

== See also ==
- Bavarian Army
- Franco-Prussian War order of battle
- German Army order of battle (1914)
- German Army order of battle, Western Front (1918)
- List of Imperial German infantry regiments
- List of Imperial German artillery regiments
- List of Imperial German cavalry regiments

== Bibliography ==
- Cron, Hermann (2002). Imperial German Army 1914-18: Organisation, Structure, Orders-of-Battle [first published: 1937]. Helion & Co. ISBN 1-874622-70-1.
- Ellis, John; Cox, Michael (1993). The World War I Databook. Aurum Press Ltd. ISBN 1-85410-766-6.
- Haythornthwaite, Philip J. (1996). The World War One Source Book. Arms and Armour. ISBN 1-85409-351-7.
- Histories of Two Hundred and Fifty-One Divisions of the German Army which Participated in the War (1914–1918), compiled from records of Intelligence section of the General Staff, American Expeditionary Forces, at General Headquarters, Chaumont, France 1919. The London Stamp Exchange Ltd. 1989 [1920]. ISBN 0-948130-87-3.
- The German Forces in the Field; 7th Revision, 11th November 1918; Compiled by the General Staff, War Office. Imperial War Museum, London and the Battery Press. 1995 [1918]. ISBN 978-1-870423-95-3.
