= 4th Royal Bavarian Division =

4th Royal Bavarian Division (4. Königlich Bayerische Division); from August 2, 1914, 4th Bavarian Infantry Division (4. Bayerische Infanterie-Division)
- Active: 1815–1919
- Country: Bavaria, German Empire
- Branch: Army
- Type: Infantry (in peacetime included cavalry)
- Size: Approximately 19,500 (on mobilisation in 1914)
- Part of: II Royal Bavarian Corps (II. Kgl. Bayer. Armeekorps)
- Garrison/HQ: Würzburg
- Engagements: Austro-Prussian War Franco-Prussian War: Battle of Weissenburg; Battle of Wörth; Battle of Sedan; Siege of Paris; World War I: Battle of the Frontiers; Race to the Sea; First Battle of Ypres; Second Battle of Artois; Battle of Loos; Battle of the Somme; Battle of Messines (1917); Battle of Passchendaele; Meuse-Argonne Offensive

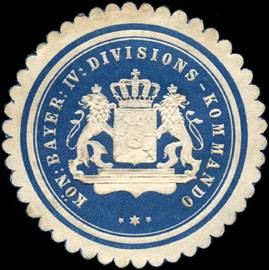

The 4th Royal Bavarian Division was a unit of the Royal Bavarian Army which served alongside the Prussian Army as part of the Imperial German Army. The division was formed on November 27, 1815, as an Infantry Division of the Würzburg General Command (Infanterie-Division des Generalkommandos Würzburg). It was called the 4th Army Division between 1822 and 1848, again between 1851 and 1859, and again from 1869 to 1872. It was called the 4th Infantry Division from 1848 to 1851 (as well as during wartime) and was named the Würzburg General Command from 1859 to 1869. From April 1, 1872, until mobilization for World War I, it was the 4th Division. In Bavarian sources, it was not generally referred to as a "Royal Bavarian" division, as this was considered self-evident, but outside Bavaria, this designation was used for it, and other Bavarian units, to distinguish them from similarly numbered Prussian units. The division was headquartered in Würzburg. The division was part of the II Royal Bavarian Army Corps.

== Combat chronicle ==
The division fought against Prussia and its allies in the Austro-Prussian War of 1866, seeing action at Roßdorf and Roßbrunn. In the Franco-Prussian War of 1870–71, the division fought alongside the Prussians. It saw action in battles of Weissenburg, Wörth and Sedan, and in the Siege of Paris.

During World War I, the division served on the Western Front. It fought in the Battle of the Frontiers against French forces in the early stages, and then participated in the Race to the Sea, fighting along the Somme and in Flanders, including the First Battle of Ypres. It remained in the trenchlines in Flanders and the Artois, and fought in the Second Battle of Artois and the Battle of Loos in 1915. In 1916, the division fought in the Battle of the Somme. In 1917, the division fought in Flanders, including in the Battle of Messines and the Battle of Passchendaele. For most of 1918, the division remained in Flanders, fighting at Armentières, Kemmel, Hébuterne, and Monchy-Bapaume. Late in the year, the division went to the Champagne region, where it faced the Allied Meuse-Argonne Offensive. After more fighting along the Aisne and the Aire, the division was withdrawn from the line, and spent the last week of the war on border defense in southern Bavaria and Tyrol. Allied intelligence rated the division as first class and of the highest quality.

== Order of battle in the Franco-Prussian War ==
The order of battle at the outset of the Franco-Prussian War was as follows:

- 7. bayerische Infanterie-Brigade
  - Kgl. Bayerisches 5. Infanterie-Regiment
  - Kgl. Bayerisches 9. Infanterie-Regiment
  - Kgl. Bayerisches 6. Jäger-Bataillon
  - Kgl. Bayerisches 10. Jäger-Bataillon
- 8. bayerische Infanterie-Brigade
  - Kgl. Bayerisches 4. Infanterie-Regiment
  - Kgl. Bayerisches 8. Infanterie-Regiment
  - Kgl. Bayerisches 5. Jäger-Bataillon
- 4. bayerische Kavallerie-Brigade
  - Kgl. Bayerisches 2. Chevaulegers-Regiment
  - Kgl. Bayerisches 5. Chevaulegers-Regiment

== Pre-World War I peacetime organization ==
In 1914, the peacetime organization of the 4th Royal Bavarian Division was as follows:

- 7. bayerische Infanterie-Brigade
  - Kgl. Bayerisches 5. Infanterie-Regiment Großherzog Ernst Ludwig von Hessen
  - Kgl. Bayerisches 9. Infanterie-Regiment Wrede
- 8. bayerische Infanterie-Brigade
  - Kgl. Bayerisches 4. Infanterie-Regiment König Wilhelm von Württemberg
  - Kgl. Bayerisches 8. Infanterie-Regiment Großherzog Friedrich II. von Baden
- 4. bayerische Kavallerie-Brigade
  - Kgl. Bayerisches 1. Ulanen-Regiment Kaiser Wilhelm II., König von Preußen
  - Kgl. Bayerisches 2. Ulanen-Regiment König
- 4. bayerische Feldartillerie-Brigade
  - Kgl. Bayerisches 2. Feldartillerie-Regiment Horn
  - Kgl. Bayerisches 11. Feldartillerie-Regiment
- Kgl. Bayerische 2. Train-Abteilung

== Order of battle on mobilization ==
On mobilization in August 1914 at the beginning of World War I, most divisional cavalry, including brigade headquarters, was withdrawn to form cavalry divisions or split up among divisions as reconnaissance units. Divisions received engineer companies and other support units from their higher headquarters. The 4th Bavarian Division, commanded by Lieutenant General Max Montgelas, was renamed the 4th Bavarian Infantry Division. Its regular 8th Bavarian Infantry Brigade was sent to the Main Reserve at Fortress Metz and replaced by a reserve formation, the 5th Bavarian Reserve Infantry Brigade with two reserve infantry regiments. The division's initial wartime organization (major units) was as follows:

- 7. bayerische Infanterie-Brigade
  - Kgl. Bayerisches 5. Infanterie-Regiment Großherzog Ernst Ludwig von Hessen
  - Kgl. Bayerisches 9. Infanterie-Regiment Wrede
  - Kgl. Bayerisches 2. Jäger-Bataillon
- 5. bayerische Reserve-Infanterie-Brigade
  - Kgl. Bayerisches Reserve-Infanterie-Regiment Nr. 5
  - Kgl. Bayerisches Reserve-Infanterie-Regiment Nr. 8
- Kgl. Bayerisches 5. Chevaulegers-Regiment Erzherzog Friedrich von Österreich
- 4. bayerische Feldartillerie-Brigade
  - Kgl. Bayerisches 2. Feldartillerie-Regiment Horn
  - Kgl. Bayerisches 11. Feldartillerie-Regiment
- 2.Kompanie/Kgl. Bayerisches 2. Pionier-Bataillon

== Late World War I organization ==
Divisions underwent many changes during the war, with regiments moving from division to division, and some being destroyed and rebuilt. During the war, most divisions became triangular - one infantry brigade with three infantry regiments rather than two infantry brigades of two regiments (a "square division"). The 4th Bavarian Infantry Division was triangularized in March 1915, sending the 8th Bavarian Reserve Infantry Regiment to the newly formed 10th Bavarian Infantry Division. An artillery commander replaced the artillery brigade headquarters, the cavalry was further reduced, and the engineer contingent was increased. Divisional signals commanders were established to better control communications, a major problem in coordinating infantry and artillery operations during World War I. The division's order of battle on April 1, 1918, was as follows:

- 7. bayerische Infanterie-Brigade
  - Kgl. Bayerisches 5. Infanterie-Regiment Großherzog Ernst Ludwig von Hessen
  - Kgl. Bayerisches 9. Infanterie-Regiment Wrede
  - Kgl. Bayerisches Reserve-Infanterie-Regiment Nr. 5
- 5.Eskadron/Kgl. Bayerisches 3. Chevaulegers-Regiment Herzog Karl Theodor
- Kgl. Bayerischer Artillerie-Kommandeur 4
  - II.Bataillon/Kgl. Bayerisches 4. Fußartillerie-Regiment
- Kgl. Bayerische Minenwerfer-Kompanie Nr. 4
- Kgl. Bayerischer Divisions-Nachrichten-Kommandeur 4
