= 2nd Royal Bavarian Heavy Cavalry "Archduke Francis Ferdinand of Austria" =

Military unit

The 2nd Royal Bavarian Heavy Cavalry "Archduke Francis Ferdinand of Austria" (Königlich Bayerisches Schwere-Reiter-Regiment „Erzherzog Franz Ferdinand von Österreich-Este“ Nr. 2) were a heavy cavalry regiment of the Royal Bavarian Army. The normal peacetime location of the regiment was Landshut. The regiment was formed in 1815 as a cuirassiers unit and fought in the Austro-Prussian War, the Franco-Prussian War and World War I. The regiment was disbanded in 1919.

== See also ==
- List of Imperial German cavalry regiments
