= 3rd Royal Bavarian Division =

3rd Royal Bavarian Division (3. Königlich Bayerische Division); from August 2, 1914, 3rd Bavarian Infantry Division (3. Bayerische Infanterie-Division)
- Active: 1815–1919
- Country: Bavaria, German Empire
- Branch: Army
- Type: Infantry (in peacetime included cavalry)
- Size: Approximately 18,000 (on mobilisation in 1914)
- Part of: II Royal Bavarian Corps (II. Kgl. Bayer. Armeekorps)
- Garrison/HQ: Nuremberg (1815-1843, 1848-1901); Landau (1901-1918)
- Engagements: Austro-Prussian War Franco-Prussian War: Battle of Wörth; Battle of Sedan; Siege of Paris; World War I: Battle of the Frontiers; Race to the Sea; First Battle of Ypres; Second Battle of Artois; Battle of Loos; Battle of the Somme; Battle of Arras (1917); Battle of Messines (1917); Second Battle of the Aisne; German spring offensive; First Battle of the Somme (1918); Hundred Days Offensive; Battle of Amiens; Second Battle of the Somme (1918)

The 3rd Royal Bavarian Division was a unit of the Royal Bavarian Army which served alongside the Prussian Army as part of the Imperial German Army. The division was formed on November 27, 1815, as an Infantry Division of the Würzburg General Command (Infanterie-Division des Generalkommandos Würzburg). It was called the 3rd Army Division between 1822 and 1848, again between 1851 and 1859, and again from 1869 to 1872. It was called the 3rd Infantry Division from 1848 to 1851 (as well as during wartime) and was named the Nuremberg General Command from 1859 to 1869. From April 1, 1872, until mobilization for World War I, it was the 3rd Division. In 1901, it had swapped division numbers with the 5th Division. In Bavarian sources, it was not generally referred to as a "Royal Bavarian" division, as this was considered self-evident, but outside Bavaria, this designation was used for it, and other Bavarian units, to distinguish them from similarly numbered Prussian units. The division was headquartered in Nuremberg from 1815 to 1843, in Ansbach from 1843 to 1848, and then again in Nuremberg until 1901, when after the renumbering of divisions, it became the 3rd Division in Landau and the division in Nuremberg became the 5th Division. The division was part of the II Royal Bavarian Army Corps.

== Combat chronicle ==
The division fought against Prussia in the Austro-Prussian War of 1866, seeing action at Zella, Kissingen, and Helmstadt. In the Franco-Prussian War of 1870-71, the division fought alongside the Prussians. It saw action in battles of Wörth and Sedan, and in the siege of Paris.

During World War I, the division served on the Western Front. It fought in the Battle of the Frontiers against French forces in the early stages, and then participated in the Race to the Sea, fighting along the Somme and in Flanders, including the First Battle of Ypres. It remained in the trenchlines in Flanders and the Artois, and fought in the Second Battle of Artois and the Battle of Loos. In 1916, the division fought in the Battle of the Somme. In 1917, the division fought in the Battle of Arras and the Battle of Messines, after which it went to the trenchlines in Verdun and Lorraine to rest. After several months in the line north of the Ailette River, the division participated in the German spring offensive, fighting in the First Battle of the Somme (1918), also known as the Second Battle of the Somme (to distinguish it from the 1916 battle). In the subsequent Allied counteroffensives known as the Hundred Days Offensive, the division fought in the Battle of Amiens and the Second Battle of the Somme (1918), also known as the Third Battle of the Somme. Thereafter, it remained in the line and resisted various Allied attacks until the end of the war. Allied intelligence rated the division as one of the best German divisions.

== Order of battle in the Franco-Prussian War ==
The order of battle at the outset of the Franco-Prussian War was as follows:

- 5. bayerische Infanterie-Brigade
  - Kgl. Bayerisches 6. Infanterie-Regiment
  - Kgl. Bayerisches 7. Infanterie-Regiment
  - Kgl. Bayerisches 8. Jäger-Bataillon
- 6. bayerische Infanterie-Brigade
  - Kgl. Bayerisches 14. Infanterie-Regiment
  - Kgl. Bayerisches 15. Infanterie-Regiment
  - Kgl. Bayerisches 3. Jäger-Bataillon
- 3. bayerische Kavallerie-Brigade
  - Kgl. Bayerisches 1. Chevaulegers-Regiment
  - Kgl. Bayerisches 6. Chevaulegers-Regiment
  - 2nd Royal Bavarian Uhlans

== Pre-World War I peacetime organization ==
In 1914, the peacetime organization of the 3rd Royal Bavarian Division was as follows:

- 5. bayerische Infanterie-Brigade
  - Kgl. Bayerisches 22. Infanterie-Regiment Fürst Wilhelm von Hohenzollern
  - Kgl. Bayerisches 23. Infanterie-Regiment
- 6. bayerische Infanterie-Brigade
  - Kgl. Bayerisches 17. Infanterie-Regiment Orff
  - Kgl. Bayerisches 18. Infanterie-Regiment Prinz Ludwig Ferdinand
- 3. bayerische Kavallerie-Brigade
  - Kgl. Bayerisches 3. Chevaulegers-Regiment Herzog Karl Theodor
  - Kgl. Bayerisches 5. Chevaulegers-Regiment Erzherzog Friedrich von Österreich
- 3. bayerische Feldartillerie-Brigade
  - Kgl. Bayerisches 5. Feldartillerie-Regiment König Alfons XIII. von Spanien
  - Kgl. Bayerisches 12. Feldartillerie-Regiment
- Landwehr-Inspektion Landau

== Order of battle on mobilization ==
On mobilization in August 1914 at the beginning of World War I, most divisional cavalry, including brigade headquarters, was withdrawn to form cavalry divisions or split up among divisions as reconnaissance units. Divisions received engineer companies and other support units from their higher headquarters. The 3rd Bavarian Division was renamed the 3rd Bavarian Infantry Division. Its initial wartime organization (major units) was as follows:

- 5. bayerische Infanterie-Brigade
  - Kgl. Bayerisches 22. Infanterie-Regiment Fürst Wilhelm von Hohenzollern
  - Kgl. Bayerisches 23. Infanterie-Regiment
- 6. bayerische Infanterie-Brigade
  - Kgl. Bayerisches 17. Infanterie-Regiment Orff
  - Kgl. Bayerisches 18. Infanterie-Regiment Prinz Ludwig Ferdinand
- Kgl. Bayerisches 3. Chevaulegers-Regiment Herzog Karl Theodor
- 3. bayerische Feldartillerie-Brigade
  - Kgl. Bayerisches 5. Feldartillerie-Regiment König Alfons XIII. von Spanien
  - Kgl. Bayerisches 12. Feldartillerie-Regiment
- 1.Kompanie/Kgl. Bayerisches 2. Pionier-Bataillon
- 3.Kompanie/Kgl. Bayerisches 2. Pionier-Bataillon

== Late World War I organization ==
Divisions underwent many changes during the war, with regiments moving from division to division, and some being destroyed and rebuilt. During the war, most divisions became triangular – one infantry brigade with three infantry regiments rather than two infantry brigades of two regiments (a "square division"). The 3rd Bavarian Infantry Division was triangularized in April 1915, sending the 22nd Bavarian Infantry Regiment to the newly formed 11th Bavarian Infantry Division. An artillery commander replaced the artillery brigade headquarters, the cavalry was further reduced, and the engineer contingent was increased. Divisional signals commanders were established to better control communications, a major problem in coordinating infantry and artillery operations during World War I. The division's order of battle on March 31, 1918, was as follows:

- 6. bayerische Infanterie-Brigade
  - Kgl. Bayerisches 17. Infanterie-Regiment Orff
  - Kgl. Bayerisches 18. Infanterie-Regiment Prinz Ludwig Ferdinand
  - Kgl. Bayerisches 23. Infanterie-Regiment
- 4.Eskadron/Kgl. Bayerisches 3. Chevaulegers-Regiment Herzog Karl Theodor
- Kgl. Bayerischer Artillerie-Kommandeur 3
  - Kgl. Bayerisches 12. Feldartillerie-Regiment
  - Fußartillerie-Bataillon Nr. 43
- Kgl. Bayerisches 2. Pionier-Bataillon
  - Kgl. Bayerische Pionier-Kompanie Nr. 5
  - Kgl. Bayerische Pionier-Kompanie Nr. 7
  - Kgl. Bayerische Minenwerfer-Kompanie Nr. 3
- Kgl. Bayerischer Divisions-Nachrichten-Kommandeur 3
