= 1st Royal Bavarian Uhlans "Emperor William II, King of Prussia" =

Military unit

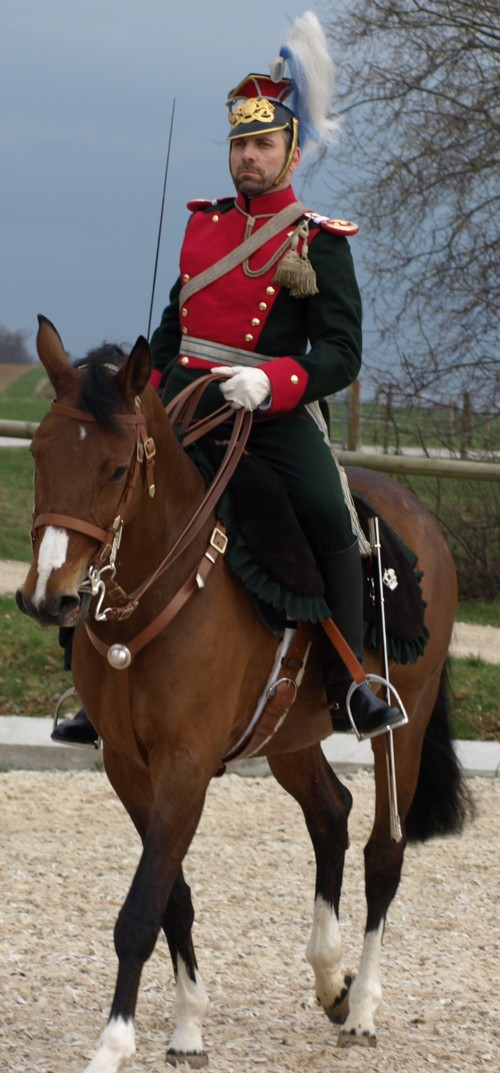
Captain of the Royal Bavarian 1st Uhlan Regiment in parade (recreated in 2008).

The 1st Royal Bavarian Uhlans "Emperor William II, King of Prussia" (Königlich Bayerisches Ulanen-Regiment „Kaiser Wilhelm II., König von Preußen“ Nr. 1) was a light cavalry regiment of the Royal Bavarian Army. The regiment was formed in 1863 as a Uhlans unit. It fought in the Austro-Prussian War, the Franco-Prussian War and World War I. In 1919 the regiment was disbanded.

== See also ==
- List of Imperial German cavalry regiments
