= 2nd Royal Bavarian Uhlans =

- Active: 1864–1919
- Country: Bavaria
- Branch: Bavarian Army
- Type: Cavalry
- Size: Regiment
- Part of: 4th Cavalry Brigade
- Engagements: Franco-Prussian War; First World War

Commanders
- Notable commanders: Otto of Bavaria

The 2nd Royal Bavarian Uhlan Regiment (German: Königliche Bayerische 2. Ulanen Regiment "König") was a Bavarian Army Cavalry Regiment formed in 1863 in Ansbach. From 6 July 1864 it was nominally commanded by King Ludwig II of Bavaria until he was succeeded by King Otto of Bavaria on 13 June 1886.

== Peacetime service and uniform ==
The regiment was part of the 4th Cavalry Brigade of then II Royal Bavarian Army Corps and later III Royal Bavarian Army Corps. The peacetime uniform was of dark green with crimson plastron and facings. A czapka with crimson top and white plume was worn in full dress.

== Active Service ==
During the Franco-Prussian War the 2.Ulanen Regiment fought at Worth and Sedan in August and September 1870. It then undertook patrol work during the Siege of Paris.

In August 1914 the regiment saw action at the Battle of the Marne and in Flanders. It was subsequently transferred to the Eastern Front.

== Disbandment ==
In common with the other Royal Bavarian cavalry regiments, the 2.Ulanen Regiment was disbanded in February 1919. Between the wars its traditions were preserved by the 2nd Squadron of the Reiter-Regiment Nr. 17 which formed part of the garrison of Ansbach.

== List of Officers - 1863 ==
Position	Rank (English)	Rank (German)	Name
Commander	Colonel	Oberst	Philipp Freiherr von Diez
Staff Officer	Major	Major	Johann Feichtmayr
Staff Officer	Major	Major	Karl von Grundherr zu Altenthann und Weyerhaus
Staff Officer	Captain	Rittmeister	Friedrich Faber
1. Escadron	Captain	Rittmeister	Gustav Oertel
2. Escadron	Captain	Rittmeister	Adolf Cronnenbold
3. Escadron	Captain	Rittmeister	Karl Fels
4. Escadron	Captain	Rittmeister	Oskar von Sichlern
	First Lieutenant	Oberlieutenant	Karl von Bieber
	First Lieutenant	Oberlieutenant	Ludwig Freiherr von Riedheim
	First Lieutenant	Oberlieutenant	Ferdinand Freiherr von Schrottenberg
	First Lieutenant	Oberlieutenant	Ferdinand Syller
Regiment Adjunct	Second Lieutenant	Unterlieutenant	Edmund von Morett
	Second Lieutenant	Unterlieutenant	Friedrich Graf von Fugger-Babenhausen
	Second Lieutenant	Unterlieutenant	Friedrich von Schütz
	Second Lieutenant	Unterlieutenant	Albert Freiherr von Rotberg
	Second Lieutenant	Unterlieutenant	Friedrich Freiherr von Crailsheim
	Second Lieutenant	Unterlieutenant	Leopold Freiherr von Andrian-Werburg
	Second Lieutenant	Unterlieutenant	Georg Vogel
	Second Lieutenant	Unterlieutenant	Christoph Freiherr von Reitzenstein
	Second Lieutenant	Unterlieutenant	Gustav von Gernler
	Officer Cadet	Junker	Wilhelm Freiherr von Feilitzsch
	Officer Cadet	Junker	Alexander Freiherr von Falkenhausen
Battalion Doctor		Bataillonsarzt	Dr. Johann Fahrnholz
Battalion Doctor		Bataillonsarzt	Dr. Michael Nigst
Doctor		Unterarzt	Dr. Ludwig Kreitmair
		Unterquartiermeister	Jakob Schütz
		Unterquartiermeister	Andreas Henninger
Division Veterinarian		Divisionsveterinärarzt	Friedrich Steinhäuser
Veterinarian		Unterveterinärarzt	Johann Köhler
Veterinarian		Unterveterinärarzt	Maximilian Wägele

== See also ==
- List of Imperial German cavalry regiments

== Sources ==
- Schulz, Hugo (1992). Die bayerischen, sächsischen, und württembergischen Kavallerie- Regimenter : 1913/1914; nach dem Gesetz vom 3. Juli 1913. Augsburg: Weltbild. pp. 27–29. ISBN 3893503420.
- Meyer, Friedrich (1888). Das Königlische Bayerische 2. Ulanen Regiment König 1863 - 1888. M. Eichinger, k.b. Hofbuchhandlung. Ansbach, Germany.
