= Battle of Charleroi =

Battle during the First World War

- Part of The Western Front of the First World War
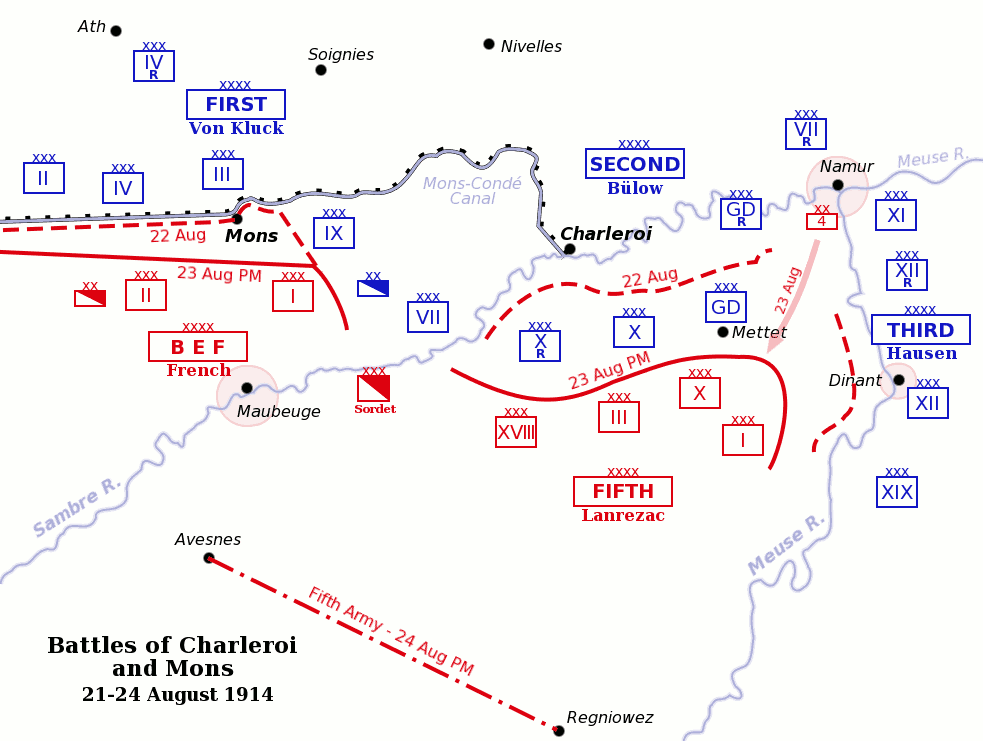
- Battle of Charleroi
Date	21–23 August 1914
Location	Near Charleroi, Belgium 50°24′N 04°26′E
Result	German victory

Belligerents
Germany	France

Commanders and leaders
Karl von Bülow; Max von Hausen	Charles Lanrezac; Joseph Joffre

Strength
2nd Army; 3rd Army	Fifth Army

Casualties and losses
11,000	14,275 (10,000 killed, 4,275 missing or wounded)
- Charleroi, a city in Wallonia, Hainaut province, Belgium

The Battle of Charleroi (French: Bataille de Charleroi) or the Battle of the Sambre, was fought on 21 August 1914, by the French Fifth Army and the German 2nd and 3rd armies, during the Battle of the Frontiers. The French were planning an attack across the Sambre River, when the Germans attacked first, forced back the French from the river and nearly cut off the French retreat by crossing the Meuse River around Dinant and getting behind the French right flank. The French were saved by a counter-attack at Dinant and the re-direction of the 3rd Army to the north-west in support of the 2nd Army, rather than south-west.

== Battle ==
By 20 August, the Fifth Army (General Charles Lanrezac) had begun to concentrate on a 40 km (25 mi) front along the Sambre, centred on Charleroi and extending east to the Belgian fortress of Namur. The I Cavalry Corps (General André Sordet) covered the Fifth Army's left flank and the concentration of the British Expeditionary Force (BEF) at Mons. The French had 15 divisions, after transfers of troops to Lorraine, facing 18 German divisions from the 2nd Army (General Karl von Bülow) and 3rd Army (Colonel-General Max von Hausen) moving south-west from Luxembourg towards the Meuse.

=== 21 August ===
On the morning of the 21st, the French commander-in-chief, the head of Grand Quartier Général (GQG), Joseph Joffre, communicated to Lanrezac and to the BEF that German troops were moving west. In accordance with Plan XVII, the Third and Fourth armies further south were to move towards, respectively, Arlon and Neufchâteau, then attack German forces in Belgian Luxembourg. The Fifth Army was ordered to cover the Meuse up to Namur and the British were to conform by moving in the general direction of Soignies, north-east of Mons. Lanrezac positioned the Fifth Army on the Sambre and reported his actions to Joffre later in the day, around 12:30. Unbeknownst to him, German elements had clashed with his vanguards between Namur and Charleroi.

Lanrezac was informed by General Augustin Michel, the commander at Namur, at 14:00. Lanrezac was told by GQG around 16:00 that the Germans were still moving west and ordered his aviation to reconnoitre German troop movements and told his subordinates that they should "be ready to launch an attack [...] by crossing the Sambre, towards Namur and Nivelles". At 20:00, having reported only minor action on the X Corps front to Joffre at 19:00, Lanrezac was instructed by the latter that he had discretion to decide of the appropriate moment to start his offensive.

By the evening, vanguards from the 19th Division, between Floriffoux and Jemeppe-sur-Sambre, had pushed back German assaults. Reports from prisoners indicated that there was a strong German presence. Further west, Arsimont, guarded initially by a battalion and then reinforced by a regiment from the 20th Division, was abandoned by 21:00 and the easternmost elements were ordered to retreat by the corps commander, Defforges, who organised positions around Fosse in coordination with I Corps and III Corps. The Germans had crossed the Sambre.

On the III Corps front, outposts of the 5th Division were attacked around 15:00. Despite initial failures, the Germans continued with their attacks and forced a passage at Tamines, Roselies and Aiseau. A French counter-attack retook Aiseau but failed in pushing the Germans back from any other bridgehead. At 23:00, the corps commander Sauret reported to Lanrezac that the 5th Division was continuing efforts to retake the bridges.

=== 22 August ===
In a report the following morning, Lanrezac confirmed to Joffre the violence on the German attack on Namur. Reporting the actions of X and III Corps, he requested that the Fourth Army "makes itself felt as soon as possible". On the French right flank, General d'Espèrey ordered I Corps troops to make movements in preparation of an offensive action. At the same time, he hastened the relief of the 2nd Division by the 51st Reserve Division. The offensive movements were stopped by an attack of the XII Saxon Corps, which attacked advanced elements of the Dinant and Anseremme bridges. Although this attack did not prevent the relief of his own troops, Espèrey reported that he would be unable to reinforce the Sambre because of it around 13:00. Authorization to blow all Meuse bridges except those at Givet, Hastière and Dinant was asked for and granted by Lanrezac at 14:15. Attacks were also launched by the Germans on the remainder of the Fifth Army front.

=== 23 August ===
Fighting continued on 23 August when the French centre around Charleroi began to fall back. The 3rd Army crossed the Meuse and attacked the French right flank, held by I Corps. The attack threatened to cut the line of retreat of the Fifth Army but I Corps stopped the German advance with a counter-attack. With the evacuation of Namur and news of the Fourth Army retreat from the Ardennes, Lanrezac ordered the Fifth Army to withdraw, lest he be encircled and cut off from the rest of the French army. The German army was victorious.

== Aftermath ==
=== Analysis ===
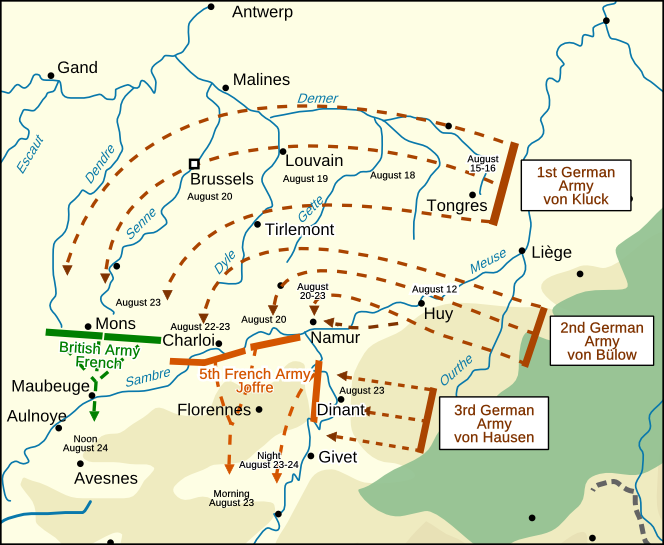
German advance through Belgium, August 1914

The Fifth Army retreat after the Battle of Charleroi, arguably saved the French army from decisive defeat, as it prevented the much sought envelopment of the Schlieffen plan. After fighting another defensive action in the Battle of St Quentin, the French were pushed to within miles of Paris. Lanrezac was sacked by Joffre on 3 September (four days after General Pierre Ruffey, the Third Army commander) and replaced by d'Espèrey. The 1934 work by the French Fascist and writer Pierre Drieu La Rochelle, The Comedy of Charleroi, explores the author's role in the battle.

=== Casualties ===
In 2001, Eric Dorn Brose recorded 10,000 Fifth Army casualties and Edward Spears in the 1999 edition of Liaison 1914 (1930) recorded 11,000 German 2nd Army casualties and its capture of 4,000 French prisoners and 35 guns. In 2009, Holger Herwig wrote that the 3rd Army suffered 4,275 casualties at Dinant.

== Orders of battle ==
=== French ===
Details taken from the French official history unless specified.

- Cavalry Corps, commanded by André Sordet
  - 1st Cavalry Division
  - 3rd Cavalry Division
  - 5th Cavalry Division
  - 8th Infantry Brigade

Fifth Army, commanded by Charles Lanrezac

- 1st Army Corps, commanded by General Louis Franchet d'Espèrey
  - 1st Infantry Division
  - 2nd Infantry Division
- 3rd Army Corps, commanded by General Sauret
  - 5th Infantry Division
  - 6th Infantry Division
- 10th Army Corps, commanded by General Defforges
  - 19th Infantry Division
  - 20th Infantry Division
  - 37th Infantry Division
- 18th Army Corps

=== German ===
Details from the British official history and Cron (2002) unless otherwise indicated.

- II Cavalry Corps Höhere Kavallerie-Kommando 2/HKK 2) – preceding 1st and 2nd Armies (General der Kavallerie Georg von der Marwitz the Senior Cavalry Commander [Höherer Kavallerie-Kommandeur 2])
  - 2nd Cavalry Division
  - 4th Cavalry Division
  - 9th Cavalry Division

Each Cavalry Division consisted of 3 Brigades, each of 2 Cavalry Regiments (24 squadrons total), 3 horse artillery batteries (4 guns each) and an MG detachment (6 MGs).

1st Army, commanded by Generaloberst Alexander von Kluck.

- II Corps (General der Infanterie Alexander von Linsingen)
  - 3rd Division
  - 4th Division
- III Corps (General d. Inf. Ewald von Lochow)
  - 5th Division
  - 6th Division
- IV Corps (General d. Inf. Friedrich Sixt von Armin)
  - 7th Division
  - 8th Division
- IX Corps (General d. Inf. Ferdinand von Quast)
  - 17th Division
  - 18th Division
- III Reserve Corps (General d. Inf. Hans von Beseler)
  - 5th Reserve Division
  - 6th Reserve Division
- IV Reserve Corps (General der Artillerie Hans von Gronau)
  - 7th Reserve Division
  - 22nd Reserve Division
- IX Reserve Corps (General d. Inf. Max von Boehn) (Originally held back in Schleswig in case of British landings; moved up in late August.)
  - 17th Reserve Division
  - 18th Reserve Division
- 10th Mixed Landwehr Brigade
- 11th Mixed Landwehr Brigade
- 27th Mixed Landwehr Brigade
- Pionier Regiment (expansion of pre-war 18th Bn)

2nd Army, commanded by Generaloberst Karl von Bülow

- Guards Corps (General d. Inf. Karl von Plettenberg)
  - 1st Guards Infantry Division
  - 2nd Guards Infantry Division
- VII Corps (General der Kavallerie Karl von Einem)
  - 13th Division
  - 14th Division
- X Corps (General d. Inf. Otto von Emmich)
  - 19th Division
  - 20th Division
- Guards Reserve Corps (General der Artillerie Max von Gallwitz)
  - 3rd Guards Infantry Division
  - 1st Guards Reserve Division
- VII Reserve Corps (General d. Inf. Hans von Zwehl)
  - 13th Reserve Division
  - 14th Reserve Division
- X Reserve Corps (General d. Inf. Günther Graf von Kirchbach)
  - 2nd Guards Reserve Division
  - 19th Reserve Division
- 25th Mixed Landwehr Brigade
- 29th Mixed Landwehr Brigade
- 4 Mortar Battalions (II & III Bns, 4th Foot Regt; I & II Bns, 9th Foot Regt)
- 10-cm Gun Battalion (II Bn, 9th Reserve Foot Regt)
- 2 Heavy Coastal Mortar Batteries (1st & 5th Btys)
- 2 Pionier Regiments (expansion of pre-war 24th & 25th Bns)
- I Cavalry Corps – preceding 3rd Army (HKK 1, General der Kavallerie Manfred Freiherr von Richthofen)
  - Guards Cavalry Division
  - 5th Cavalry Division

3rd Army, commanded by Generaloberst Max von Hausen

- XI Corps (General d. Inf. Otto von Plüskow)
  - 22nd Division
  - 38th Division
- XII (1st Royal Saxon) Corps (General d. Inf. Karl d'Elsa)
  - 23rd Division
  - 32nd Division
- XIX (2nd Royal Saxon) Corps (General der Kavallerie Maximilian von Laffert)
  - 24th Division
  - 40th Division
- XII (Royal Saxon) Reserve Corps (General der Artillerie Hans von Kirchbach)
  - 23rd Reserve Division
  - 24th Reserve Division
- 47th Mixed Landwehr Brigade
- Mortar Battalion (III Bn, 1st Foot Regt)
- Pionier Regiment (expansion of pre-war 23rd Bn)
