= Royal Saxon Army =

- Active: 1 January 1682; 344 years ago – 11 November 1918; 107 years ago
- Country: Electorate of Saxony; Kingdom of Saxony
- Allegiance: House of Wettin
- Branch: Army
- Headquarters: Dresden; Königstein; Chemnitz; Kraków; Leipzig; Großenhain; Bautzen; Plauen
- Patron: The Saint Elizabeth of Hungary, & Saint George
- Colours: Black, green, yellow, white
- Engagements: Great Northern War; Silesian Wars; Seven Years' War; War of the Bavarian Succession; Napoleonic Wars; Austro-Prussian War; Franco-Prussian War; World War I

Commanders
- Notable commanders: Frederick Augustus I Johann von Thielmann; Albert of Saxony; Max von Hausen

The Royal Saxon Army (German: Königlich Sächsische Armee) was the military force of the Electorate (1682–1807) and later the Kingdom of Saxony (1807–1918). A regular Saxon army was first established in 1682 and it continued to exist until the abolition of the German monarchies in 1918. With the formation of the Confederation of the Rhine by Napoleon the Royal Saxon Army joined the French "Grande Armée" along with 37 other German states.

== History ==
=== During the Electorate of Saxony (1682–1807) ===
The founder of the standing army in Saxony was Elector Johann Georg III. He convinced the Saxon Estates in 1681 that the established practice of in case of war hiring mercenaries and dismissing them in peace, was as costly as the formation of a standing army. In 1682 the hitherto existing home troops and Guard and other small units were consolidated in line regiments. The army consisted of six infantry regiments of eight companies and five cavalry regiments. The field artillery consisted out of 24 guns.

The Northern War proved the combat power of the Saxon army to be very low, so that after the war a military reform was enacted which aimed to increase their military efficiency. As part of this reform, the Saxon army was brought to a strength of 30,000, which consisted almost exclusively of Saxons. Thus it differed from the armies of other European states, which supplemented their staff frequently with foreigners.

Following the reform, the army consisted of Guard Infantry, line infantry, and cavalry regiments (Chevau-légers, Dragoons and cuirassiers) together. The artillery as a third independent branch of service and was made up of field artillery and in-house. Also belonging to the artillery, were Mineurs and pontoniers established companies. The army was divided into four General Houses and classified according to the state of Saxony into four military divisions. For the first time for the accommodation of the troops barracks were built.

During the Second Silesian War, Saxony allied with Austria. The Saxon army suffered heavily under Friedrich August Graf Rutowski in the battle of Kesselsdorf against Prussia. The growing crisis bankrupted the state and forced the Saxon Prime Minister Graf Brühl in 1749 to reduce the army to 17,000 men.

During the Seven Years' War Saxony was again invaded by Prussia and the Saxon army was invested by the Prussian army in the Siege of Pirna where they had to capitulate on 16 October 1756. Only four cavalry regiments and two Lancers formations, which were located in Poland, escaped the surrender. Frederick II of Prussia forced the Saxon regiments to swear an oath of allegiance to Prussia, which at least most of the officers refused. Ten infantry regiments and one battalion of Chevau-légers were provided with Prussian uniforms and placed in the hostile army. However, this was not successful because the majority of the troops deserted. From 1757, most of the "booty-regiments" dissolved, only three of which remained at war's end. The same year a Saxon corps under Prince Prince Francis Xavier of Saxony was raised in Hungary. After the war, Prince Francis Xavier as regent for the underage Elector Friedrich August III sought to reform the army to Prussian model, but failed because of the resistance of the estates because of high costs.

Saxony fought in the War of the Fourth Coalition in 1806 initially on the side of Prussia. In the battles of Saalfeld and Jena–Auerstedt, the Saxon and Prussian armies were heavily defeated. After these defeats the French occupied Saxony.

=== Napoleonic wars ===
Saxony became a member state of the Confederation of the Rhine and on 20 December 1806, the Electorate was created a kingdom by the graces of Napoleon.

During the Battle of Friedland, a small division of two brigades, two cavalry regiments, and two foot batteries served in the French Reserve Corps under Marshal Jean Lannes.

The Saxon troops participated in War of the Fifth Coalition in 1809 against the Empire of Austria which made clear that the army needed to be reformed in order to build a modern and organized army in the French style. The 1810 reform was based on the 1804 drill book – which increased the rapid march to 90 steps from the previous 75 – and the 1808 French infantry regulations and led by General Lecoq, the Major-Generals Karl Wilhelm Ferdinand von Funck, Karl Friedrich Wilhelm von Gersdorff and Johann von Thielmann and Colonel Friedrich von Langenau.

Further changes in the Saxon military reforms:

1. Rejuvenation of the officer corps
2. Reduction of the surgical staff at the same time improving the Military Medicine
3. Discontinuation of muskets for officers – instead, service with a drawn sword
4. Creation of Battalion Staff in 1809
5. Improvement of the military administration of justice with a ban on corporal punishment as a punishment measure
6. Changing the uniform to the French model and the introduction of new muskets, bayonets and side arms
7. Training in new combat methods: columns with skirmishers instead of the old, rigid form of Linear Tactics
8. Launching of a first drill regulations for the artillery
9. Instead of advertising in Germany using recruitment, a nationwide recruiting circuit with commissions was established. Soldiers were enlisted for fixed period of service of eight to ten years.

The new army administration brought totally different conditions, especially in relation to food, clothing and equipment of the troops. The command of the renewed army was nominally the King. In 1810, Major General Heinrich von Cerrini was Minister of War and General von Gersdorff chief of the General Staff. As a result of military reform, the Royal Saxon Army was formed along the following structure:

- The first Cavalry Division with three brigades, one regiment of Hussars and the Garde du Corps.
- The first Infantry division with two brigades and a regiment of Grenadier Guards,
- The second Infantry division with two brigades and one light infantry brigade.

To these were added:

- Artillery units (horse and foot artillery) and
- Special corps, which were subordinated to the chief of staff. These were:
  - an engineer corps of sappers and pontoniers (later the engineer units)
  - garrison companies such as the semi-invalids from companies not fit for field service, Cadet Corps and the Royal Swiss Guard.

After the reforms of 1810 the army consisted of 31 infantry battalions and artillery brigades (24,937 men), 36 squadrons of cavalry (6,577 men) and an engineering corps (266 men); all in all 31,780 men.

On 15 February 1812 the army was mobilized for the upcoming French invasion of Russia. The Saxon contingent was formed as the 21st and 22nd Division of the VII Army Corps of Grande Armée under the command of the French General of Division Jean Reynier. The Saxons fielded 18 infantry battalions, 28 Cavalry squadrons, 56 (six and four-pounder) guns, together 200 men and 7,000 horses. The Saxons fought in the battles of Kobrin and Gorodechno before joining the Grande Armée in its retreat. A detachment of cuirassiers was separated from the main army and placed in a different corps and participated in the Battle of Borodino.

After the failure of the invasion, the campaign of 1813 mainly centered around Saxon territory. When the Russo-Prussian armies invaded Saxony, King Frederick Augustus fled to Bohemia. The Saxon army was then invested in the fortress of Torgau. After the defeat of the Allies at Lützen and Bautzen and due to the hesitant attitude of Austria, Frederick Augustus had no choice but to support Napoleon. Thus the Saxon army fought during the 1813 Autumn campaign on the French side. In the Battle of Leipzig on the third day of battle a major part of the Saxon contingent defected to the Allies and Frederick Augustus was taken prisoner. The Saxon army was reorganized in 1813 at Merseburg then at 1814 at Flanders by Johann von Thielmann and participated in the occupation of the Netherlands. The Congress of Vienna decided in favor of dividing Saxony by giving Prussia a large portion of its population and parts of his army. Protests of the Saxon troops handed over to and integrated in the Prussian army were violently suppressed by the Prussians. The scaled down Saxon Corps took part in the 1815 campaign under Seventh Coalition command in the Upper Rhine. The Saxons continued to occupy France with the allies until 1818.

=== German Confederation ===
In the Armed Forces of the German Confederation Saxony provided the fourth largest contingent, after Austria, Prussia and Bavaria. The Saxon troops, together with the quotas from Hesse-Kassel and Nassau, formed the mixed IX. Army Corps.

Organization of Army of Kingdom of Saxony as of 20 June 1866

When the Austro-Prussian War in 1866 began, Saxony supported Austria and mobilized its 32,000-strong army around Dresden under the command of Crown Prince Albert. After the declaration of war the Prussian Army crossed the border on 16 July 1866 near Strehla and Löbau. Saxony unsuccessfully called for the support of the army of the Confederation and of Austria but the Saxon army was forced to pull back because of the military situation into Bohemia and effected a junction with the Austrians. The Saxon army took a prominent part in the battles by which the Prussians forced the line of the Jizera and in the Battle of Jičín. The Crown Prince, however, succeeded in effecting the retreat in good order, and with his troops took part in the decisive Battle of Königgrätz (3 July 1866) where the Saxons held the extreme left of the Austrian position. The Saxons maintained their post with great tenacity, but were involved in the disastrous defeat of their allies.

=== North German Confederation ===
After the peace Saxony was forced to join the North German Confederation. According to the Military Convention of 7 February 1867 its army formed the XII Corps, which was placed under Prussian command. Saxony had to hand over the Fortress Königstein to Prussia. The Kingdom of Saxony took part in the 1870 Franco-Prussian War on the side of Prussia.

On the outbreak of the war Prince Albert again commanded the Saxons, who were included in the 2nd army under Prince Frederick Charles of Prussia, his old opponent. At the Battle of Gravelotte, they formed the extreme left of the German army, and with the Prussian Guard carried out the attack on St Privat, the final and decisive action in the battle. In the re-organisation of the army which accompanied the march towards Paris the Crown Prince gained a separate command over the 4th army (Army of the Meuse) consisting of the Saxons, the Prussian Guard corps, and the IV (Prussian Saxony) corps. Albert was succeeded in command of the XII Corps by his brother Prince George.

Albert and the Saxons took a leading part in the operations which preceded the battle of Sedan, the 4th army being the pivot on which the whole army wheeled round in pursuit of Mac-Mahon; and the actions of Buzancy and Beaumont on 29 and 30 August 1870 were fought under his direction; in the Battle of Sedan itself (1 September 1870), with the troops under his orders, Albert carried out the envelopment of the French on the east and north.

Albert's conduct in these engagements won for him the complete confidence of the army, and during the Siege of Paris his troops formed the north-east section of the investing force. After the conclusion of the Treaty of Frankfurt (1871), he was left in command of the German army of occupation, a position which he held till the fall of the Paris Commune. On the conclusion of peace he was made an inspector-general of the army and a Generalfeldmarschall.

Saxony also financially benefited from the campaign: its share of the French reparations flowed in part in the construction of Albertstadt, a modern complex of barracks in Dresden, which contains nowadays the Bundeswehr Military History Museum and the Army Officer Training School as only military units left.

=== German Empire ===
After the founding of the German Empire on 18 January 1871, the Kingdom of Saxony kept the limited autonomy in military matters which it had under the Convention of 1867. It retained, despite certain jurisdictional disputes in the postwar period, a separate Ministry of War, general staff and military academy. The Saxon army continued in the Imperial German army as the XII (1st Royal Saxon) Corps, based in Dresden. The Corps consisted out of the 1st and 2nd Division. In 1889, the Saxon Corps raised a 3rd Division, and in 1899 a 4th Division. In 1899, the creation of the two new divisions caused a reorganization of the Saxon army in two army corps, the existing XII, based in Dresden, and the newly formed XIX (2nd Royal Saxon) Corps to be based in Leipzig. Saxon troops also provided a share of the occupation forces in Alsace-Lorraine (XV Corps).

Of technical troops until the First World War the Saxon Army consisted of:

- 2 Königl. Battalion of the Royal Saxon. Prussian Railway Regiment 1
- Royal. Saxon fortress Telephonic Company No. 7
- 3 Königl. Saxon Airship Company of the Battalion 2
- 3 Königl. Saxon Company of Battalion No. 1 Flyer
- Royal. Saxon Detachment of the 2nd Company of the battalion motor vehicles
- Royal. Detachment at the Royal Prussian Saxony Traffic Technical Examination

=== World War I ===
When the First World War started, the two Saxon Army Corps, and the XII (Royal Saxon) Reserve Corps were mobilized as part of the 3rd Army under command of the former Saxon War Minister, Generaloberst Max von Hausen. The 3rd Army fought in the battle of the Frontiers, mainly in the battles of Dinant and Charleroi. After the Second Army's retreat after the First Battle of the Marne, Hausen saw his own flank exposed and ordered a retreat. After the stabilization of the front on the Aisne River, on September 9, 1914, Hausen was relieved of his command due to illness and replaced by General Karl von Einem.

The Saxon troops were used mostly at the Western Front. As the war progressed, through the necessary additions the units becoming increasingly mixed with troops from the other German states. During the war Saxony mobilized a total of about 750,000 soldiers, of whom about 229,000 did not return.

== Army Organization ==
=== During the Napoleonic Wars ===
Ranks of the Royal Saxon Army during 1807-1813

General Staff Ranks of the Royal Saxon Army during 1807-1813
Rank (German Name)	French or English Equivalent	Work Done
Chef des Generalstabes	Chief of Staff	Oversees the army's general staff, responsible for strategic planning, coordination of operations, and advising the commanding officer (e.g., a monarch or senior general).
Adjutant des Generalstabes	Adjutant of the General Staff	Acts as a deputy or assistant to the Chief of Staff
Inspecteur Général aux Revues	Inspector General of Reviews	Conducts inspections, audits, and evaluations of troops, equipment, and procedures to ensure compliance with regulations and readiness.
General	General	Leads a Corps
Generalleutnant	Lieutenant General	Leads a Division
Generalmajor	Major General	Leads a Brigade
General-Adjutant	Adjutant General	Serves as a senior administrative officer, managing personnel records, orders, and communications for high-ranking commanders.
Flügel-Adjutant	Wing Adjutant	Typically a personal aide-de-camp to a monarch or high-ranking noble, responsible for relaying orders and handling ceremonial duties.

The General-Adjutant, Flügel-Adjutant, Inspecteur Général aux Revues, and Adjutant des Generalstabes did not have much involvement on the actual battlefields during the Napoleonic Wars, command was mainly done by the Lieutenant and Major Generals.

Regimental Ranks of the Royal Saxon Army in 1807
Rank (German Name)	French or English Rank Equivalent	Designation	Notes
Oberster	Colonel	Regiment Officer	Commands over a regiment.
Oberstleutnant	Lieutenant Colonel	Regiment Officer	Commands over a regiment as second in command.
Major	Major	Battalion Officer	Commands over a Battalion.
Kapitän 1ster Classe	Captain First Class	Company Officer	Commands over a Company
Kapitän 2ter Classe	Captain 2nd Class	Company Officer	Commands over a Company
Premierlieutenant	First Lieutenant	Company Officer	Commands over a Company as second in command.
Sousleutnant	Second Lieutenant	Company Officer	Commands over a Company as second in command.
Feldwebel Wachtmeister Commarendiersergeant	Sergeant Major	Non-Commissioned Officer	Feldwebel was used for infantry regiments, Wachtmeister for cavalry regiments, and Commariendersergeant for the artillery.
Sergeant Feuerwerker	Sergeant	Non-Commissioned Officer	Sergeant was used for infantry and cavalry regiments, Feuerwerker was used for the artillery.
Fourier	Corporal Fourier	Non-Commissioned Officer	
Corporal	Corporal	Non-Commissioned Officer	
Mousquetier Schützen Grenadier Reiter Canonier	Private	Rank and File	Mousquetier was used for the main line infantry, Schützen was used for skrimish and light infantry, Grenadier was used for the guards and infantry grenadiers, Reiter was used for cavalry regiments, Canonier was used for the artillery regiments,

==== Organization of the Royal Saxon Army in 1810 ====
Unit (English Name)	Unit (German Name)	Chief	Commander	Garrison
INFANTRY REGIMENTS
Life Grenadier Guard Regiment	Leibgrenadiergarde Regiment	General von Lindt (Deceased 1805)	Colonel von Warnsdorff	Dresden
Infantry Regiment "King"	Infanterie-Regiment "König"	King Frederick Augustus I of Saxony	Colonel von Göphardt	Dresden, Großenhain
Infantry Regiment "of Niesemeuschel"	Infanterie-Regiment "von Niesemeuschel"	Vacant	Colonel Vogel	Dresden, Großenhain
Infantry Regiment "Prince Anthony"	Infanterie-Regiment "Prinz Anton"	Crown Prince Anthony	Colonel von Larisch	Bautzen, Görlitz, Sorau
Infantry Regiment "of Low"	Infanterie-Regiment "von Low"	Vacant	Colonel von Jeschki	Luckau, Guben, Sorau
Infantry Regiment "Prince Maximilian"	Infanterie-Regiment "Prinz Maximilian"	Prince Maximilian of Saxony	Colonel von Ehrenstein	Chemnitz, Döbeln, Freiberg
Infantry Regiment "of Rechten"	Infanterie-Regiment "von Rechten"	Vacant	Colonel von Gablenz	Zwickau, Schneeberg, Freiberg
Infantry Regiment "Prince Frederick Augustus"	Infanterie-Regiment "Prinz Friedrich August"	Prince Frederick Augustus of Saxony	Colonel von Brochowski	Torgau, Oschatz, Wittenberg
Infantry Regiment "Prince Clemens"	Infanterie-Regiment "Prinz Clemens"	Prince Clemens of Saxony	Colonel von Wellentin	Leipzig, Eilenberg, Wittenberg
1st Light Infantry Regiment "of Le Coq"	1. Leichtes-Infanterie Regiment "von Le Coq"	-	Major von Egidy	Zeitz, Weißenfels
2nd Light Infantry Regiment "of Sahr"	2. Leichtes-Infanterie Regiment "von Sahr"	-	Colonel von Tettenborn	Naumburg, Merseburg
Rifle Corps	Jägerkorps	-	Major von Carlowitz	Eckartsberga
CAVALRY REGIMENTS
Garde du Corps	Garde du Corps	General von Zeschwitz	Major General von Mangold	Dresden, Pirna, Radeberg, Dippoidswalde
Life Cuirassier Guard	Leib-Cürassier-Garde	King Frederick Augustus I of Saxony	Colonel von Liebenau	Oeberan, Frankenberg, Marienberg, Penig
Cuirassier-Regiment "of Zastrow"	Cürassier-Regiment "von Zastrow"	Vacant	Colonel von Grünenwald	Grimma, Rochlitz, Geithain, Borna
Chevauxlegers Regiment "Prince Clemens"	Chevaulegers-Regiment "Prinz Clemens"	Prince Clemens of Saxony	Colonel von Gablenz	Pegau, Schkeuditz, Lützen, Zwenkau
Chevauxlegers-Regiment "Prince Albert"	Chevaulegers-Regiment "Prinz Albrecht"	Prince Albert of Saxony-Teschen	Lieutenant Colonel von Lessing	Lübben, Lübbenau, Cottbus
Chevauxlegers-Regiment "Prince John"	Chevaulegers-Regiment "Prinz Johann"	Prince John of Saxony	Colonel von Kleist	Mühlberg, Schmiedeberg, Düben, Kemberg
Chevauxlegers-Regiment "of Polenz"	Chevaulegers-Regiment "von Polenz"	Vacant	Colonel Freiherr von Ende	Querfert, Sangershausen, Schaafstedt, Freiburg
Hussar Regiment	Husarenregiment	Major General Freiherr von Gutschmid	Colonel von Engel	Cölleda, Artern, Heidrungen, Schönewerda, Langensalza, Wiche
OTHER UNITS
Foot Artillery Regiment	Fuss-Artillerie Regiment	-	-	Dresden
Mounted Artillery Brigade	Reitende-Artillerie Brigade	-	-	Dresden
Train Battalion	Trainbattailon	-	-	Dresden

A common misconception about the Saxon infantry regiments is that they were numbered, there is no evidence of any of the line infantry regiments being numbered, however the light infantry regiments were assigned numbers. Additionally, there were also garrison companies for fortresses and other defensive structures. In Dresden, there was a Swiss Guard, Cadet Corps, and an artillery academy.

These units were divided into brigades and divisions, being organized as follows:

- 1st Infantry Division - Lieutenant General von Zeschau
  - Life Grenadier Guard Regiment
  - 1st Brigade - Major General von Dryherrn
    - Infantry Regiments "König" and "von Niesemeuschel"
    - Grenadier-Battalion "von Brause"
  - 2nd Brigade - Major General von Nostitz
    - Infantry Regiments "Prinz Anton" and "von Low"
    - Grenadier-Battalion "von Anger"
- 2nd Infantry Division - Lieutenant General Edler von Le Coq
  - 1st Brigade - Major General von Klengel
    - Infantry Regiments "Prinz Maximilian" and "von Rechten"
    - Grenadier-Battalion "von Spiegel"
  - 2nd Brigade - Major General von Steindel
    - Infantry Regiments "Prinz Friedrich August" and "Prinz Clemens"
    - Grenadier-Battalion "von Liebenau"
- Light Infantry Brigade - Major General Saher von Sahr
  - Light Infantry Regiments "von Le Coq" and "von Sahr"
  - Rifle Corps
- Cavalry Division - Lieutenant General Freiherr von Gutschmidt
  - Garde du Corps Regiment
  - 1st Brigade - Lieutenant General von Funck
    - Chevauxleger Regiments "Prinz Clemens" and "von Polenz"
    - Hussar Regiment
  - 2nd Brigade - Lieutenant General von Thielemann
    - Life Cuirassier Guard
    - Cuirassier Regiment "von Zastrow"
  - 3rd Brigade - Major General von Barner
    - Chevauxleger Regiments "Prinz Johann" and "Prinz Albrecht"
    - Reitende-Artillerie-Brigade

Some units were also maintained in Dresden and subordinate to the General staff members present in the city. These were the following:

- Foot Artillery Regiment
- Cadet Corps
- Royal Swiss Guard
- Engineer Corps
- Sappers and Pontoniers
- Garrison Companies

==== Organization of the Royal Saxon Army in 1812 at the Beginning of the Russian Campaign ====
FIRST DIVISION - Lieutenant General Edler von Le Coq
1st Brigade - Major General von Steindel Grenadier-Battalion "von Liebenau" Line Infantry Regiment "Prinz Friedrich August" Line Infantry Regiment "Prinz Clemens"	2nd Brigade - Major General von Nostitz Line Infantry Regiment "Prinz Anton" 1st Light Infantry Regiment "von Le Coq"
Artillery and Pontoniers - Major Grossman 1 Mounted Artillery Battery with 6 guns 1 Foot Battery with 6 guns 1 Company of Sappers and Pontoniers	Cavalry - Lieutenant General von Funck Chevauxlegers Regiment "Prinz Clemens" Chevauxlegers Regiment "vacant Polenz"
SECOND DIVISION - Lieutenant General Freiherr von Gutschmidt
1st Brigade - Major General von Klengel Grenadier-Battalion "von Brause" Line Infantry Regiment "König" Line Infantry Regiment "von Niesemeuschel"	2nd Brigade - Major General von Sahr Grenadier Battalion "von Anger" Grenadier Battalion "von Spiegel" 2nd Light Infantry Regiment "von Sahr"
Artillery - Major Auenmüller 1 Mounted Artillery Battery with 6 guns 1 Foot Artillery Battery with 6 guns	Cavalry Garde du Corps Cuirassier Regiment "vacant Zastrow" Chevauxlegers Regiment "Prinz Albrecht"

The other regiments of the Royal Saxon Army had either stayed in Saxony or defended other garrisons and supply depots which were responsible for supplying the Grande Armée. The Garde du Corps, and Zastrow cuirassiers were sent to a different corps and participated in the charge of the Great Redoubt during the Battle of Borodino, and rescued Napoleon from the cossacks.

The commanding staff of the Saxon divisions is listed as follows:

- Commander: Lieutenant General Edler von Le Coq
- Chief of Staff: Colonel von Langenau
- Intendant: Major von Ryssel
- Artillery Commander: Lieutenant Colonel von Hoyer
- Senior Engineer Officer: Captain Damm

=== Structure in World War I ===
==== Pre and early war ====
The Kingdom of Saxony placed an army corps (later two army corps) at the disposal of the army of the German Empire in peacetime:

- XII (1st Royal Saxon) Corps in Dresden
  - 23rd (1st Royal Saxon) Division in Dresden
  - 32nd (3rd Royal Saxon) Division in Bautzen
- XIX (2nd Royal Saxon) Corps in Leipzig
  - 24th (2nd Royal Saxon) Division in Leipzig
  - 40th (4th Royal Saxon) Division in Chemnitz

On mobilisation, these were joined by reserve formations:

- XII (Royal Saxon) Reserve Corps
  - 23rd (1st Royal Saxon) Reserve Division
  - 24th (2nd Royal Saxon) Reserve Division

Together with the XI Corps, these formed the 3rd Army forming part of the right wing of the forces for the Schlieffen Plan offensive in August 1914 on the Western Front.

In peacetime, the Royal Saxon Army also provided

105th (6th Royal Saxon) Infantry "King William II of Württemberg" to the XV Army Corps at Straßburg
12th (1st Royal Saxon) Foot Artillery to the XVI Army Corps at Metz

==== Raised during World War I ====
Infantry Divisions:

- 58th (5th Royal Saxon) Division
- 96th (6th Royal Saxon) Division
- 123rd (7th Royal Saxon) Division
- 192nd (8th Royal Saxon) Division
- 212th (9th Royal Saxon) Division
- 219th (10th Royal Saxon) Division
- 241st (11th Royal Saxon) Division

Reserve Division:

- 53rd (3rd Royal Saxon) Reserve Division

Landwehr Divisions:

- 45th (1st Royal Saxon) Landwehr Division
- 46th (2nd Royal Saxon) Landwehr Division
- 47th (3rd Royal Saxon) Landwehr Division

Ersatz Division:

- 19th (Royal Saxon) Ersatz Division

== Uniforms and Arms ==
=== Napoleonic Wars ===
==== After the Military Reorganization in 1810 ====
After the military reorganization of 1810, the Saxon units adopted French styles of dress, with their old Seven Years War-era uniforms becoming obsolete.

The Line Infantry dressed in white coats with their facings being in regiment colors. The 1st and 2nd regiments wore red, the 3rd and 4th wore dark blue, the 5th and 6th wore yellow, and the 7th and 8th wore green. The Grenadiers had grenades on their tailcoats and a distinct plume. The hats of the infantry had a shako plate with the cipher FAR (Fridericus Augustus Rex) embedded on the metal, with a pompom for the rankers painted in a bicolor fashion, the top half being of the regiments color and the bottom half being white. Non-commissioned officers typically had a black top half for their pompom.

== See also ==
- Order of the Rue Crown
- Freikorps

== Bibliography ==
- Hoffmann, Jan (2007). Die sächsische Armee im Deutschen Reich 1871 bis 1918 (PDF) (in German) (Dissertation ed.). Dresden, Germany.
