= Karl Ludwig d'Elsa =

Royal Saxon army officer

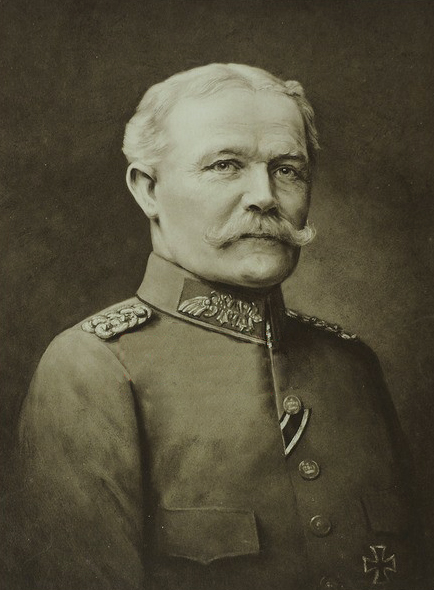
- Born: 1 November 1849; Dresden, Kingdom of Saxony
- Died: 20 July 1922 (aged 72); Tannenfeld bei Nöbdenitz, Löbichau, Thuringia, Germany
- Military career
- Allegiance: German Empire
- Branch: Imperial German Army
- Service years: 1870–1920
- Rank: Generaloberst
- Commands: 13th (2nd Royal Saxon) Jäger Bataillon; 101st (2nd Royal Saxon) Grenadiers "Emperor William, King of Prussia"; 48th (4th Royal Saxon) Infantry Brigade; 64th (6th Royal Saxon) Infantry Brigade; 24th (2nd Royal Saxon) Division; XII (1st Royal Saxon) Corps; Armee-Abteilung A
- Conflicts: Franco-Prussian War; World War I
- Awards: Pour le Mérite

Karl Ludwig d'Elsa (born 1 November 1849 in Dresden – died 20 July 1922 in Tannenfeld bei Nöbdenitz, Löbichau, Thuringia) was a Royal Saxon army officer who was a Generaloberst in the First World War and awarded the Pour le Mérite.

== Life and Military Career ==
Karl Ludwig d'Elsa was born on 1 September 1849 in Dresden in the Kingdom of Saxony, the son of Ludwig Ferdinand d'Elsa (1806–1882), an Oberstleutnant (Lieutenant Colonel), and Huberta Louise (née von Brandenstein, died 1911).

d'Elsa joined the Cadet Corps in Easter 1864 and on 1 April 1869 was appointed as an ensign in the 101st (2nd Royal Saxon) Grenadiers "Emperor William, King of Prussia" of the Royal Saxon Army. From October 1869 to April 1870 he was assigned to the military school in Erfurt and promoted to 2nd Lieutenant on 29 July 1870. From 1 September 1870 he was adjutant of the first battalion of his regiment, with whom he participated in the Franco-Prussian War. He participated in the battles of St. Privat, Beaumont and Sedan, and the Siege of Paris. For his service in the Franco-Prussian War, he was awarded the Iron Cross (1870).

After the war d'Elsa received further training from 1 October 1871 to 1 March 1872 at the Military Riding Institute Dresden. From 24 June 1873 to 17 April 1875 he was regimental adjutant in his parent regiment, and then of the 45th (1st Royal Saxon) Infantry Brigade. In 1874, he was promoted to 1st Lieutenant. From 1878 to 1881 he was assigned as a company commander in the Corps of Cadets. On 1 April 1881 he was promoted to captain and was assigned as company commander of the 2nd Company of the 100th (1st Royal Saxon) Life Grenadiers. Two years later he became the company commander of the 1st Company of the regiment. In 1887, d'Elsa was adjutant of the XII (1st Royal Saxon) Corps, and in 1889 he was promoted to major.

In 1892 he became commander of the 13th (2nd Royal Saxon) Jäger Bataillon. In 1893 he became lieutenant colonel, and in 1895 he was appointed as chief of General Army Section at the Saxon Ministry of War. After D'Elsa was promoted to colonel in 1896, he commanded the 101st (2nd Royal Saxon) Grenadiers "Emperor William, King of Prussia", after which he led as a Generalmajor (promoted 1899) the 48th (4th Royal Saxon) Infantry Brigade (1900–1902) and the 64th (6th Royal Saxon) Infantry Brigade (1902–1904). From 4 September 1902 d'Elsa served as General à la suite of George, King of Saxony and his promotion to Generalleutnant on 23 April 1904 serving as adjutant general. From 19 June 1904 d'Elsa served as commander of the 24th (2nd Royal Saxon) Division; he was promoted to General der Infanterie on 23 September 1908. On 29 March 1910 he was appointed commanding general of XII (1st Royal Saxon) Corps, one of the top three peacetime positions in the Saxon contingent of the Imperial German Army.

== World War I ==
Karl d'Elsa was in command of XII (1st Royal Saxon) Corps at the outset of World War I, part of the predominantly Saxon 3rd Army on the right wing of the forces that invaded France as part of the Schlieffen Plan offensive in August 1914. He led the XII Corps at the First Battle of the Marne and First Battle of the Aisne. On 17 April 1916 he was given command of Armee-Abteilung A on the Western Front but was placed on inactive reserve status on 4 January 1917.

He was decorated with the Pour le Mérite on 1 September 1916.

== Later life ==
D'Elsa was placed on inactive reserve status in early 1917. On 23 January 1918, he was promoted to the rank of Charakter of Generaloberst (an honorary rank). After the armistice, the Allies wanted to try d'Elsa as a war criminal for his alleged role in atrocities committed against Belgian civilians.

From 1918 to 1922, d'Elsa was president of the Saxon War Veterans' Association. He retired from the Army on 21 January 1920. D'Elsa died on 20 July 1922 at Tannenfeld bei Nöbdenitz, in the Löbichau district of Thuringia.

== Honours ==
National

- Kingdom of Saxony:
  - Grand Cross of the Order of Merit of Saxony
  - Knight Grand Cross in the Albert Order, with Swords on Rings
  - Commander 2nd Class of the Military Order of St. Henry on 3 May 1915
  - Royal Saxon Cross Service Award

Foreign

- Austrian Empire: Grand Cordon of the Imperial Order of Franz Joseph
- Kingdom of Bavaria: 1st Class of the Military Merit Order.
- Kingdom of Belgium: Grand Officer of the Order of Leopold
- Japan:
  - Commander of the Order of the Rising Sun
  - Commander of the Order of the Sacred Treasure
- Kingdom of Italy: 2nd Class of the Order of the Iron Crown.
- Kingdom of Prussia:
  - Knight Grand Cross of the Order of the Red Eagle
  - 1st Class of the Order of the Crown.
  - 2nd Class of the Iron Cross (1870).
  - Pour le Mérite on 1 September 1916
- Reuss: Cross of Honour 1st Class (Reuß Younger Line)
- Saxe-Weimar-Eisenach: Knight Grand Cross in the Order of the White Falcon
- Saxe-Coburg and Gotha: Knight Grand Cross in the Saxe-Ernestine House Order
- Thailand: Order of the Crown of Thailand 2nd Class
- Spain: Cross of Military Merit, 4th Class
- Kingdom of Württemberg: Commander with Star of the Order of the Crown

== Family ==
D'Elsa was married twice, firstly in 1875 to Margarethe Anna Elise (née Andrée). After her death in 1888, he remarried in 1891 to Caroline Charlotte (née von Stieglitz). He had three sons, Walther, Karl and Johann, and three daughters, Elisabeth, Margarethe Dorothe and Priska.

== Glossary ==
- Armee-Abteilung or Army Detachment in the sense of "something detached from an Army". It is not under the command of an Army so is in itself a small Army.
- Armee-Gruppe or Army Group in the sense of a group within an Army and under its command, generally formed as a temporary measure for a specific task.
- Heeresgruppe or Army Group in the sense of a number of armies under a single commander.

== Bibliography ==
- von Baensch-Stiftung, Wilhelm; von Baensch-Stiftung, Bertha (1937). Der Königlich Sächsische Militär-St. Heinrichs-Orden 1736–1918, Ein Ehrenblatt der Sächsischen Armee. Dresden.
- Cron, Hermann (2002). Imperial German Army 1914–18: Organisation, Structure, Orders-of-Battle [first published: 1937]. Helion & Co. ISBN 1-874622-70-1.

Military offices
Preceded by Generalleutnant Hermann von Broizem	Commander, XII (1st Royal Saxon) Corps; 26 September 1910 – 17 April 1916	Succeeded by Generalleutnant Horst Edler von der Planitz
Preceded by Generaloberst Ludwig von Falkenhausen	Commander, Armee-Abteilung A 17 April 1916 – 4 January 1917	Succeeded by General der Infanterie Bruno von Mudra
