= Max von Hausen =

German general (1846-1922)

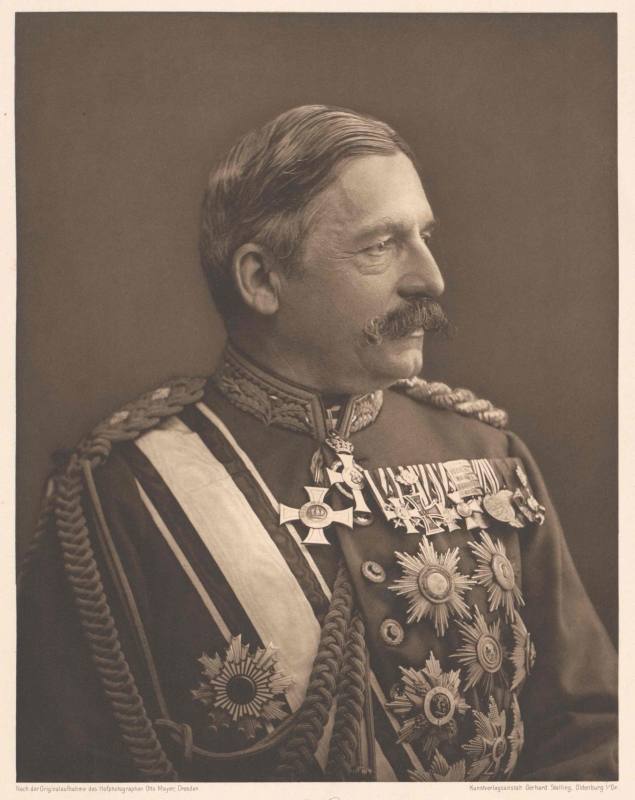
- Born: 17 December 1846; Dresden, Kingdom of Saxony, German Confederation
- Died: 18 March 1922 (aged 75); Dresden, Free State of Saxony, Weimar Republic
- Known for: the Sack of Dinant

Details
- Date: 21–28 August 1914
- Locations: Dinant, Namur Province, Wallonia, Belgium
- Killed: 674
- Military career
- Allegiance: Kingdom of Saxony; North German Confederation; German Empire
- Branch: Royal Saxon Army; Imperial German Army
- Service years: 1864–1920
- Rank: Minister of War of Saxony; Generaloberst
- Conflicts: Austro-Prussian War; Battle of Königgrätz; Franco-Prussian War; First World War; Battle of Dinant; Battle of Charleroi; First Battle of the Marne
- Awards: Order of the Black Eagle; Order of the Red Eagle; Iron Cross

Max Clemens Lothar Freiherr von Hausen (17 December 1846 – 19 March 1922) was a German military officer during the First World War. He participated in the Austro-Prussian and Franco-German Wars and became Generaloberst of Saxon troops and War Minister in the Kingdom of Saxony. At the beginning of the First World War, he was the head of the Third Army which he led during the Battles of the Frontiers, Charleroi, and the Marne. He was relieved of his command because of illness in September 1914.

== Life ==
=== Early life ===
Max Clemens Lothar von Hausen was born on 17 December 1846 in Dresden-Neustadt as the second son of Clemens von Hausen and Anna Wilhelmine von Ammon.

His mother Anna was the daughter of the surgeon and ophthalmologist Friedrich August von Ammon. Through his mother he was also a great-grandson of the protestant theologian Christoph Friedrich von Ammon by whom he was baptized.

=== Military career ===
Coming from a military family Hausen entered the Saxon army as a cadet in the royal Saxon school of cadets. Being promoted to Seconde-Lieutenant in 1864 he joined the 3rd Jäger Battalion and served against Prussia in the Austro-Prussian War of 1866; where he saw action at the Battle of Königgrätz. After that war, Saxony allied with Prussia and became a part of the German Empire when it was created in 1871. From 1871 to 1874 Hausen taught at the Prussian military academy in Berlin and from 1875 until 1887 he served on the Imperial German General Staff. Being the chief of staff of the Saxon army from 1892 to 1895 he commanded the 32nd (3rd Royal Saxon) Division from 1897 to 1900 and the XII (1st Royal Saxon) Corps from 1900 to 1902. He served as Minister of War of the Kingdom of Saxony from 1902 to 1914, being promoted to Generaloberst in 1910. During Hausen's service year as Minister of War, he tried to have a good relationships with Prussian Army. In 1914, Hausen requested to be released from his more than 50 year service.

== First World War ==
Upon mobilization in August 1914, the Royal Saxon Army became the German Third Army and Hausen was given command. His army participated in the Battle of the Frontiers, mainly in the battles of Dinant, where Hausen's troops summarily executed over 600 of its inhabitants, including several women and children (one of them just 3 weeks old), and Charleroi, and he and his army were responsible for the destruction of Reims in September 1914. When asked about how such deeds would eventually be known into history, he replied:

"We should write history ourselves."

After the Second Army's retreat after the First Battle of the Marne, Hausen saw his own flank exposed and ordered a retreat. After the stabilization of the front on the Aisne River, on 9 September 1914, Hausen was relieved of his command due to illness and replaced by General Karl von Einem. Hausen held no further field commands during the war, and died shortly after the war ended. He was occupied by writing about his memories during his last years.

== Dates of rank ==
- 31 July 1864: Sekonde-Lieutenant (2Lt)
- 31 July 1866: Premier-Lieutenant (1Lt)
- 2 January 1872: Hauptmann (Cpt)
- 1 April 1881: Major (Maj)
- 1 April 1887: Oberstleutnant (Ltc)
- 20 March 1890: Oberst (Col)
- 25 March 1893: Generalmajor (MGen)
- 17 December 1896: Generalleutnant (LGen)
- 12 May 1901: General der Infanterie (Gen)
- 17 December 1910: Generaloberst (ColGen)

== Decorations and awards ==
Kingdom of Saxony

- Order of the Rue Crown
- Knight's Cross of the Military Order of St. Henry
- Grand Cross of the Albert Order

Kingdom of Prussia / German Empire

- Order of the Black Eagle 30.09.1909
- Order of Merit of the Prussian Crown
- Grand Cross of the Order of the Red Eagle with chain
- Iron Cross, 2nd Class of 1870

Other German states

- Kingdom of Bavaria: Military Merit Order
- Grand Duchy of Baden: Order of the Zähringer Lion, Knight 1st Class
- Kingdom of Württemberg: Grand Cross of the Order of the Crown

Foreign

Austria-Hungary

- Grand Cross of the Order of Leopold

== Sources ==
- Barbara Tuchman, The Guns of August (New York, 1972)
- Günter Wegner, Stellenbesetzung der deutschen Heere 1815-1939 (Biblio Verlag, Osnabrück, 1993)

Military offices
Preceded by Heinrich Leo von Treitschke	Chief of General Staff of Saxony; 9 March 1892 – 1 March 1895	Succeeded by Hermann von Broizem
Preceded by Ernst Köpke (preceded by Ludwig von Falkenhausen)	Quartermaster-General of the German Army; 1 March 1895 – 17 April 1896	Succeeded by Franz Xaver von Oberhoffer
Preceded by Paul von der Planitz	Minister of War of Saxony; 10 February 1902 – 21 May 1914	Succeeded by Adolph von Carlowitz
Preceded by New Formation	Commander, 3rd Army; 2 August – 12 September 1914	Succeeded by Karl von Einem
