= 123rd Infantry Division (German Empire) =

123rd Infantry Division (123. Infanterie-Division)
- Active: 1915–19
- Country: Saxony, German Empire
- Branch: Army
- Type: Infantry
- Size: Approx. 12,500
- Engagements: World War I: Battle of Loos; Battle of the Somme; German spring offensive; Second Battle of the Marne; Meuse-Argonne Offensive

The 123rd Infantry Division (123. Infanterie-Division) was a formation of the Imperial German Army in World War I. The division was formed on 1 April 1915, and organized over the next several weeks. It was part of a wave of new infantry divisions formed in the spring of 1915. The division was disbanded in 1919 during the demobilization of the German Army after World War I.

The division was a Royal Saxon division, made up of troops from that kingdom. It was formed primarily from the excess infantry regiments of regular infantry divisions which were being triangularized. The division's 245th Infantry Brigade was the former 64th Infantry Brigade of the 32nd (3rd Royal Saxon) Infantry Division, and came to the division with the 178th Infantry Regiment. The 106th Reserve Infantry Regiment came from the 24th (2nd Royal Saxon) Reserve Division and the 182nd Infantry Regiment came from the 23rd (1st Royal Saxon) Infantry Division.

== Combat chronicle ==
The 123rd Infantry Division initially fought on the Western Front in World War I, entering the line in the Aisne region in mid-April 1915. Later in 1915, it fought in the Battle of Loos. It remained on the front in the Flanders and Artois regions into 1916, and in July entered the Battle of the Somme, where it reportedly lost 6,000 men. It was transferred to the Eastern Front at the end of the month, where it went into the line near Lake Narač until November 1917, when it returned to the Western Front. It went into the line near Verdun until May 1918. It later fought in the Second Battle of the Marne and then returned to the line near Verdun. Late in 1918, it faced the Allied Meuse-Argonne Offensive. It remained in the line until the end of the war. Allied intelligence rated the division as third class and of mediocre combat value.

== Order of battle on formation ==
The 123rd Infantry Division was formed as a triangular division. The order of battle of the division on 1 April 1915 was as follows:

- 245. Infanterie-Brigade
  - Kgl. Sächsisches Reserve-Infanterie-Regiment Nr. 106
  - Kgl. Sächsisches 13. Infanterie-Regiment Nr. 178
  - Kgl. Sächsisches 16. Infanterie-Regiment Nr. 182
- 1. Eskadron/Kgl. Sächsisches 1. Husaren-Regiment "König Albert" Nr. 18
- 5. Eskadron/Kgl. Sächsisches 3. Husaren-Regiment Nr. 20
- Kgl. Sächsisches Feldartillerie-Regiment Nr. 245
- Fußartillerie-Batterie Nr. 123
- Kgl. Sächsische Pionier-Kompanie Nr. 245

== Late-war order of battle ==
The division underwent relatively few organizational changes over the course of the war. The 182nd Infantry Regiment was sent to the newly formed 212th Infantry Division in 1916 and was replaced by the 425th Infantry Regiment, which was in turn replaced by the 351st Infantry Regiment. Cavalry was reduced, artillery and signals commands were formed, and combat engineer support was expanded to a full pioneer battalion. The order of battle on 3 June 1918 was as follows:

- 245. Infanterie-Brigade
  - Kgl. Sächsisches Reserve-Infanterie-Regiment Nr. 106
  - Kgl. Sächsisches 13. Infanterie-Regiment Nr. 178
  - Kgl. Sächsisches Infanterie-Regiment Nr. 351
- 5.Eskadron/Kgl. Sächsisches 3. Husaren-Regiment Nr. 20
- Kgl. Sächsischer Artillerie-Kommandeur 123
  - Kgl. Sächsisches Feldartillerie-Regiment Nr. 245
  - Fußartillerie-Bataillon Nr. 137
- Kgl. Sächsisches Pionier-Bataillon Nr. 123
  - Pionier-Kompanie Nr. 123
  - Pionier-Kompanie Nr. 245
  - Minenwerfer-Kompanie Nr. 123
- Kgl. Sächsischer Divisions-Nachrichten-Kommandeur 123
