= XII (1st Royal Saxon) Corps =

XII (1st Royal Saxon) Army Corps XII. (I. Königlich Sächsisches) Armee-Korps
- Flag of the Staff of a Generalkommando (1871–1918)
- Active: 1 April 1867–1919
- Country: Kingdom of Saxony; German Empire
- Type: Corps
- Size: Approximately 44,000 (on mobilisation in 1914)
- Garrison/HQ: Dresden/Große Klostergasse 4
- Patron: King of Saxony
- Shoulder strap piping: White
- Engagements: Franco-Prussian War Battle of Gravelotte Battle of Sedan Siege of Paris World War I Battle of the Frontiers

The XII (1st Royal Saxon) Army Corps / XII AK (German: XII. (I. Königlich Sächsisches) Armee-Korps) was a Saxon corps level command of the Saxon and German Armies before and during World War I.

The Corps was formed as the Royal Saxon Corps on 1 April 1867 and headquartered in Dresden. Initially, it commanded the 1st Royal Saxon Infantry Division in Dresden and the 2nd Royal Saxon Infantry Division in Leipzig. After the XIX (2nd Royal Saxon) Corps was set up on 1 April 1899 as the headquarters for the western part of the Kingdom of Saxony, XII Corps was made responsible for the eastern part of the Kingdom.

The Corps was disbanded with the demobilisation of the German Army after World War I.

== Franco-Prussian War ==
During the Franco-Prussian War, the corps fought in the Battle of Gravelotte, the Battle of Sedan and the Siege of Paris.

=== Order of Battle during the Franco-Prussian War ===
The organization of the XII (Royal Saxon) Corps on 18 August 1870 at the beginning of the Franco-Prussian War was as follows:

Commander: General Crown Prince Albert of Saxony
Chief of the General Staff: Lt. Col. Friedrich von Zezschwitz

- 23rd (1st Royal Saxon) Infantry Division - Lt. General Prince George of Saxony
- 24th (2nd Royal Saxon) Infantry Division - Maj. General Erwin Nehrhoff von Holderberg
- Saxon Cavalry Division - Major General Franz Graf und Edler Herr zur Lippe-Weißenfeld
- 12th (Royal Saxon) Field Artillery Regiment - Col. Bernhard Oskar von Funcke
- 12th (Royal Saxon) Pioneer Battalion - Lt. Col. Karl Hugo Klemm
- 12th (Royal Saxon) Train Battalion - Lt. Col. Edmund Schmalz

== Between the wars ==
On 1 April 1887 another Saxon division was formed (32nd (3rd Royal Saxon) Infantry Division headquartered in Bautzen) and assigned to the Corps.

As the German Army expanded in the latter part of the 19th Century, the XIX (2nd Royal Saxon) Corps was set up on 1 April 1899 in Leipzig as the Generalkommando (headquarters) for the western part of the Kingdom of Saxony (districts of Leipzig, Chemnitz and Zwickau). It took over command of 24th (2nd Royal Saxon) Division and the newly formed 40th (4th Royal Saxon) Division. Thereafter, XII Corps was responsible for the eastern part of the Kingdom.

The Corps was assigned to the II Army Inspectorate which formed the predominantly Saxon 3rd Army at the start of the First World War.

=== Peacetime organisation ===
The 25 peacetime Corps of the German Army (Guards, I - XXI, I - III Bavarian) had a reasonably standardised organisation. Each consisted of two divisions with usually two infantry brigades, one field artillery brigade and a cavalry brigade each. Each brigade normally consisted of two regiments of the appropriate type, so each Corps normally commanded 8 infantry, 4 field artillery and 4 cavalry regiments. There were exceptions to this rule:

V, VI, VII, IX and XIV Corps each had a 5th infantry brigade (so 10 infantry regiments)
II, XIII, XVIII and XXI Corps had a 9th infantry regiment
I, VI and XVI Corps had a 3rd cavalry brigade (so 6 cavalry regiments)
the Guards Corps had 11 infantry regiments (in 5 brigades) and 8 cavalry regiments (in 4 brigades).

Each Corps also directly controlled a number of other units. This could include one or more

Foot Artillery Regiment
Jäger Battalion
Pioneer Battalion
Train Battalion

Peacetime organization of the Corps
Corps	Division	Brigade	Units	Garrison
XII (1st Royal Saxon) Corps	23rd (1st Royal Saxon) Division	45th (1st Royal Saxon) Infantry Brigade	100th (1st Royal Saxon) Life Grenadiers	Dresden
XII (1st Royal Saxon) Corps	23rd (1st Royal Saxon) Division	45th (1st Royal Saxon) Infantry Brigade	101st (2nd Royal Saxon) Grenadiers "Emperor William, King of Prussia"	Dresden
XII (1st Royal Saxon) Corps	23rd (1st Royal Saxon) Division	46th (2nd Royal Saxon) Infantry Brigade	108th (Royal Saxon) Schützen (Füsiliers) "Prince George"	Dresden
XII (1st Royal Saxon) Corps	23rd (1st Royal Saxon) Division	46th (2nd Royal Saxon) Infantry Brigade	182nd (16th Royal Saxon) Infantry	Freiberg
XII (1st Royal Saxon) Corps	23rd (1st Royal Saxon) Division	23rd (1st Royal Saxon) Field Artillery Brigade	12th (1st Royal Saxon) Field Artillery	Dresden, Königsbrück
XII (1st Royal Saxon) Corps	23rd (1st Royal Saxon) Division	23rd (1st Royal Saxon) Field Artillery Brigade	48th (4th Royal Saxon) Field Artillery	Dresden
XII (1st Royal Saxon) Corps	23rd (1st Royal Saxon) Division	23rd (1st Royal Saxon) Cavalry Brigade	1st Royal Saxon Guards Heavy Cavalry	Dresden
XII (1st Royal Saxon) Corps	23rd (1st Royal Saxon) Division	23rd (1st Royal Saxon) Cavalry Brigade	17th (1st Royal Saxon) Uhlans "Emperor Francis Joseph of Austria, King of Hungary"	Oschatz
XII (1st Royal Saxon) Corps	32nd (3rd Royal Saxon) Division	63rd (5th Royal Saxon) Infantry Brigade	102nd (3rd Royal Saxon) Infantry "King Ludwig III of Bavaria"	Zittau
XII (1st Royal Saxon) Corps	32nd (3rd Royal Saxon) Division	63rd (5th Royal Saxon) Infantry Brigade	103rd (4th Royal Saxon) Infantry	Bautzen
XII (1st Royal Saxon) Corps	32nd (3rd Royal Saxon) Division	64th (6th Royal Saxon) Infantry Brigade	177th (12th Royal Saxon) Infantry	Dresden
XII (1st Royal Saxon) Corps	32nd (3rd Royal Saxon) Division	64th (6th Royal Saxon) Infantry Brigade	178th (13th Royal Saxon) Infantry	Kamenz
XII (1st Royal Saxon) Corps	32nd (3rd Royal Saxon) Division	32nd (3rd Royal Saxon) Field Artillery Brigade	28th (2nd Royal Saxon) Field Artillery	Bautzen
XII (1st Royal Saxon) Corps	32nd (3rd Royal Saxon) Division	32nd (3rd Royal Saxon) Field Artillery Brigade	64th (5th Royal Saxon) Field Artillery	Pirna
XII (1st Royal Saxon) Corps	32nd (3rd Royal Saxon) Division	32nd (3rd Royal Saxon) Cavalry Brigade	18th (1st Royal Saxon) Hussars "King Albert"	Großenhain
XII (1st Royal Saxon) Corps	32nd (3rd Royal Saxon) Division	32nd (3rd Royal Saxon) Cavalry Brigade	20th (3rd Royal Saxon) Hussars	Bautzen
XII (1st Royal Saxon) Corps	Corps Troops		12th (1st Royal Saxon) Jäger Battalion	Freiberg
XII (1st Royal Saxon) Corps	Corps Troops		13th (2nd Royal Saxon) Jäger Battalion	Dresden
XII (1st Royal Saxon) Corps	Corps Troops		19th (2nd Royal Saxon) Foot Artillery	Dresden
XII (1st Royal Saxon) Corps	Corps Troops		12th (1st Royal Saxon) Pioneer Battalion	Pirna
XII (1st Royal Saxon) Corps	Corps Troops		12th (1st Royal Saxon) Train Battalion	Dresden, Bischofswerda
XII (1st Royal Saxon) Corps	Corps Troops		7th (Royal Saxon) Telegraph Battalion	Dresden
XII (1st Royal Saxon) Corps	Dresden Defence Command (Landwehr-Inspektion)			Dresden

== World War I ==
=== Organisation on mobilisation ===
On mobilization on 2 August 1914 the Corps was restructured. 23rd Cavalry Brigade was withdrawn to form part of the 8th Cavalry Division and the 32nd Cavalry Brigade was broken up and its regiments assigned to the divisions as reconnaissance units. Divisions received engineer companies and other support units from the Corps headquarters. In summary, XII Corps mobilised with 25 infantry battalions, 9 machine gun companies (54 machine guns), 8 cavalry squadrons, 24 field artillery batteries (144 guns), 4 heavy artillery batteries (16 guns), 3 pioneer companies and an aviation detachment.

Initial wartime organization of the Corps
Corps	Division	Brigade	Units
XII (1st Royal Saxon) Corps	23rd (1st Royal Saxon) Division	45th Infantry Brigade	100th Life- Grenadier Regiment
XII (1st Royal Saxon) Corps	23rd (1st Royal Saxon) Division	45th Infantry Brigade	101st Grenadier Regiment
XII (1st Royal Saxon) Corps	23rd (1st Royal Saxon) Division	46th Infantry Brigade	108th Schützen Regiment
XII (1st Royal Saxon) Corps	23rd (1st Royal Saxon) Division	46th Infantry Brigade	182nd Infantry Regiment
XII (1st Royal Saxon) Corps	23rd (1st Royal Saxon) Division	23rd Field Artillery Brigade	12th Field Artillery Regiment
XII (1st Royal Saxon) Corps	23rd (1st Royal Saxon) Division	23rd Field Artillery Brigade	48th Field Artillery Regiment
XII (1st Royal Saxon) Corps	23rd (1st Royal Saxon) Division		20th Hussar Regiment
XII (1st Royal Saxon) Corps	23rd (1st Royal Saxon) Division		1st Company, 12th Pioneer Battalion
XII (1st Royal Saxon) Corps	23rd (1st Royal Saxon) Division		23rd Divisional Pontoon Train
XII (1st Royal Saxon) Corps	23rd (1st Royal Saxon) Division		1st Medical Company
XII (1st Royal Saxon) Corps	23rd (1st Royal Saxon) Division		3rd Medical Company
XII (1st Royal Saxon) Corps	32nd (3rd Royal Saxon) Division	63rd Infantry Brigade	102nd Infantry Regiment
XII (1st Royal Saxon) Corps	32nd (3rd Royal Saxon) Division	63rd Infantry Brigade	103rd Infantry Regiment
XII (1st Royal Saxon) Corps	32nd (3rd Royal Saxon) Division	63rd Infantry Brigade	12th Jäger Battalion
XII (1st Royal Saxon) Corps	32nd (3rd Royal Saxon) Division	64th Infantry Brigade	177th Infantry Regiment
XII (1st Royal Saxon) Corps	32nd (3rd Royal Saxon) Division	64th Infantry Brigade	178th Infantry Regiment
XII (1st Royal Saxon) Corps	32nd (3rd Royal Saxon) Division	32nd Field Artillery Brigade	28th Field Artillery Regiment
XII (1st Royal Saxon) Corps	32nd (3rd Royal Saxon) Division	32nd Field Artillery Brigade	64th Field Artillery Regiment
XII (1st Royal Saxon) Corps	32nd (3rd Royal Saxon) Division		18th Hussar Regiment
XII (1st Royal Saxon) Corps	32nd (3rd Royal Saxon) Division		2nd Company, 12th Pioneer Battalion
XII (1st Royal Saxon) Corps	32nd (3rd Royal Saxon) Division		3rd Company, 12th Pioneer Battalion
XII (1st Royal Saxon) Corps	32nd (3rd Royal Saxon) Division		32nd Divisional Pontoon Train
XII (1st Royal Saxon) Corps	32nd (3rd Royal Saxon) Division		2nd Medical Company
XII (1st Royal Saxon) Corps	Corps Troops		I Battalion, 19th Foot Artillery Regiment
XII (1st Royal Saxon) Corps	Corps Troops		29th Aviation Detachment
XII (1st Royal Saxon) Corps	Corps Troops		12th Corps Pontoon Train
XII (1st Royal Saxon) Corps	Corps Troops		12th Telephone Detachment
XII (1st Royal Saxon) Corps	Corps Troops		12th Pioneer Searchlight Section
XII (1st Royal Saxon) Corps	Corps Troops		Munition Trains and Columns corresponding to II Corps

=== Combat chronicle ===
On mobilisation, XII Corps was assigned to the predominantly Saxon 3rd Army forming part of the right wing of the forces for the Schlieffen Plan offensive in August 1914 on the Western Front. It was transferred to the 2nd Army on 14 September 1914 and to the 7th Army one day later. It would later serve under the 5th Army and the 3rd Army again. It was still in existence at the end of the war in Armee-Abteilung B, Heeresgruppe Herzog Albrecht von Württemberg at the extreme southern end of the Western Front.

== Commanders ==
The XII Corps had the following commanders during its existence:

From	Rank	Name
23 February 1867	General der Infanterie	Crown Prince Albert of Saxony
19 August 1870	General der Infanterie	Prince Georg of Saxony
22 March 1900	Generalleutnant	Max von Hausen
26 August 1902	General der Infanterie	Crown Prince Friedrich Augustus of Saxony
18 October 1904	Generalleutnant	Hermann von Broizem
26 September 1910	General der Infanterie	Karl Ludwig d'Elsa
17 April 1916	Generalleutnant	Horst Edler von der Planitz
8 September 1917	General der Kavallerie	Hans Krug von Nidda
24 July 1918	Generalleutnant	Max Leuthold

== Glossary ==
- Armee-Abteilung or Army Detachment in the sense of "something detached from an Army". It is not under the command of an Army so is in itself a small Army.
- Armee-Gruppe or Army Group in the sense of a group within an Army and under its command, generally formed as a temporary measure for a specific task.
- Heeresgruppe or Army Group in the sense of a number of armies under a single commander.

== See also ==
- German Army order of battle (1914)
- German Army order of battle, Western Front (1918)
- List of Imperial German infantry regiments
- List of Imperial German artillery regiments
- List of Imperial German cavalry regiments
- Royal Saxon Army

== Bibliography ==
- Cron, Hermann (2002). Imperial German Army 1914-18: Organisation, Structure, Orders-of-Battle [first published: 1937]. Helion & Co. ISBN 1-874622-70-1.
- Ellis, John; Cox, Michael (1993). The World War I Databook. Aurum Press Ltd. ISBN 1-85410-766-6.
- Haythornthwaite, Philip J. (1996). The World War One Source Book. Arms and Armour. ISBN 1-85409-351-7.
- Histories of Two Hundred and Fifty-One Divisions of the German Army which Participated in the War (1914-1918), compiled from records of Intelligence section of the General Staff, American Expeditionary Forces, at General Headquarters, Chaumont, France 1919. The London Stamp Exchange Ltd. 1989 [1920]. ISBN 0-948130-87-3.
- The German Forces in the Field; 7th Revision, 11th November 1918; Compiled by the General Staff, War Office. Imperial War Museum, London and the Battery Press. 1995 [1918]. ISBN 978-1-870423-95-3.
