= 46th Landwehr Division =

46th Landwehr Division (2nd Royal Saxon)
- 46. Landwehr-Division (2. Königlich Sächsische)
- Active: February 15, 1917 – March 26, 1919
- Country: Saxony; German Empire
- Branch: Royal Saxon Army
- Type: Infantry
- Size: Division
- Garrison/HQ: Dresden
- Engagements: Eastern Front (World War I) Lithuanian–Soviet War

The 46th Landwehr Division (German: 46. Landwehr-Division (2. Königlich Sächsische)) was a Royal Saxon Army Landwehr infantry division in World War I and the Lithuanian–Soviet War.

== Battle calendar ==
The division was formed in February 1917 from militia (Landwehr) and reserve (Ersatz) units in the area of the XII (1st Royal Saxon) Corps in Dresden. It then went to the Eastern Front in mid-March 1917, remained there after the end of the war and acted as a police and occupation force in Lithuania.

=== 1917 ===
- March 13 – December 5 – Static battle between Nemunas-Berezina-Kreva-Smarhon-Narach lake-Tverečius
  - 19–27 July – Defensive battle at Smarhon-Kreva
- 6–17 December – Ceasefire
- From December 17 – Armistice

=== 1918 ===
- Until February 18 – Armistice
- February 18 – March 3 – pursuing battles through Belarus
- March 3 – November 15 – occupation of Russian territory
- From November 16 – occupation and security service in Lithuania and Belarus

=== 1919 ===
- Until 11 February – Occupation and security service in Lithuania

On February 22, 1919, Lieutenant General Walter von Eberhardt became the divisional commander.

The Southern Lithuania Brigade (German: Brigade Südlitauen), a Freikorps, was formed from the division's volunteer units on March 26, 1919. It consisted of the following units: 18th, 19th and 20th Volunteer Regiments, the 18th Volunteer Aviation Squadron and the 18th and 19th Volunteer Artillery Abteilung. The Brigade fought with the Lithuanian Army against the invading Red Army troops in the Lithuanian–Soviet War. In June 1919, the Southern Lithuania Brigade was reorganized into the 28th (Saxon) Reichswehr Brigade and had a strength of 134 officers and 5,833 men. The last volunteers from the Southern Lithuania Brigade left Kaunas, Lithuania, on 11 July 1919 and moved from Virbalis to Zeithain by mid-August.

== Order of Battle ==
=== As of 15 February 1917 ===
- 46th Landwehr Infantry Brigade
  - 101st Landwehr Infantry Regiment
  - 103rd Landwehr Infantry Regiment
  - 105th Landwehr Infantry Regiment
- 4th Squadron/17th Uhlan Regiment "Emperor Franz Joseph of Austria, King of Hungary" (1st Royal Saxon)
- 246th Field Artillery Regiment
- Landwehr Pionier Company/XII (1st Royal Saxon) Corps
- Scheinwerferzug Nr. 404
- 346th Mortar Company
- 546th Divisional Telephone Department

=== After 25 January 1918 ===
- 46th Landwehr Infantry Brigade
  - 101st Landwehr Infantry Regiment
  - 103rd Landwehr Infantry Regiment
  - 105th Landwehr Infantry Regiment
- 4th Squadron/17th Uhlan Regiment "Emperor Franz Joseph of Austria, King of Hungary" (1st Royal Saxon)
- 140th Artillery Command
  - 246th Field Artillery Regiment
- 446th Pionier Battalion
- 546th Divisional Signals Command

== Commanders ==
Rank	Name	Date
Generalleutnant	Bernhard von Watzdorf	13 February – 8 September 1917
Generalmajor	Otto von Ompteda	8 September 1917 – 7 August 1918
Generalmajor	Albrecht von Mandelsloh	7 August 1918 – 21 February 1919
Generalleutnant	Walter von Eberhardt	22 February 1919 – April 1919

== Bibliography ==
- Ruhmeshalle unserer Alten Armee. herausgegeben auf Grund amtlichen Materials des Reichsarchivs, Militär-Verlag, Berlin 1927, S. 70, 141.
- Histories of Two Hundred and Fifty-One Divisions of the German Army Which Participated in the War (1914-1918). Document (United States. War Department) No. 905. Washington, D.C.: Government Printing Office. 1920. p. 473. OCLC 1387464.
- Artur Baumgarten-Crusius: Die Sachsen im Felde 1914–1918. Verlag der Literaturwerke „Minerva“, R. Max Lippold, Leipzig 1923, S. 515–516.
