= XIX (2nd Royal Saxon) Corps =

XIX (2nd Royal Saxon) Army Corps XIX. (II. Königlich Sächsisches) Armee-Korps
- Flag of the Staff of a Generalkommando (1871–1918)
- Active: 1 April 1899–1919
- Country: Kingdom of Saxony / German Empire
- Type: Corps
- Size: Approximately 44,000 (on mobilisation in 1914)
- Garrison/HQ: Leipzig/Thomasring 2
- Patron: King of Saxony
- Shoulder strap piping: Red
- Engagements: World War I Battle of the Frontiers First Battle of the Marne

Insignia
- Abbreviation: XIX AK

The XIX (2nd Royal Saxon) Army Corps / XIX AK (German: XIX. (II. Königlich Sächsisches) Armee-Korps) was a Saxon corps level command of the German Army, before and during World War I.

As the German Army expanded in the latter part of the 19th century and early part of the 20th century, the XIX Army Corps was set up on 1 April 1899 in Leipzig as the Generalkommando (headquarters) for the western part of the Kingdom of Saxony (districts of Leipzig, Chemnitz and Zwickau). It took over command of 24th (2nd Royal Saxon) Division from XII (1st Royal Saxon) Corps and the newly formed 40th (4th Royal Saxon) Division.

It was assigned to the II Army Inspectorate which formed the predominantly Saxon 3rd Army at the start of the First World War. It was still in existence at the end of the war in the 19th Army, Heeresgruppe Herzog Albrecht von Württemberg on the Western Front.

== Peacetime organisation ==
The 25 peacetime Corps of the German Army (Guards, I - XXI, I - III Bavarian) had a reasonably standardised organisation. Each consisted of two divisions with usually two infantry brigades, one field artillery brigade and a cavalry brigade each. Each brigade normally consisted of two regiments of the appropriate type, so each Corps normally commanded 8 infantry, 4 field artillery and 4 cavalry regiments. There were exceptions to this rule:

V, VI, VII, IX and XIV Corps each had a 5th infantry brigade (so 10 infantry regiments)
II, XIII, XVIII and XXI Corps had a 9th infantry regiment
I, VI and XVI Corps had a 3rd cavalry brigade (so 6 cavalry regiments)
the Guards Corps had 11 infantry regiments (in 5 brigades) and 8 cavalry regiments (in 4 brigades).

Each Corps also directly controlled a number of other units. This could include one or more

Foot Artillery Regiment
Jäger Battalion
Pioneer Battalion
Train Battalion

Peacetime organization of the Corps
Corps	Division	Brigade	Units	Garrison
XIX (2nd Royal Saxon) Corps	24th (2nd Royal Saxon) Division	47th (3rd Royal Saxon) Infantry Brigade	139th (11th Royal Saxon) Infantry	Döbeln
XIX (2nd Royal Saxon) Corps	24th (2nd Royal Saxon) Division	47th (3rd Royal Saxon) Infantry Brigade	179th (14th Royal Saxon) Infantry	Wurzen, Leisnig
XIX (2nd Royal Saxon) Corps	24th (2nd Royal Saxon) Division	48th (4th Royal Saxon) Infantry Brigade	106th (7th Royal Saxon) Infantry "King George"	Leipzig
XIX (2nd Royal Saxon) Corps	24th (2nd Royal Saxon) Division	48th (4th Royal Saxon) Infantry Brigade	107th (8th Royal Saxon) Infantry "Prince John George"	Leipzig
XIX (2nd Royal Saxon) Corps	24th (2nd Royal Saxon) Division	24th (2nd Royal Saxon) Field Artillery Brigade	77th (7th Royal Saxon) Field Artillery	Leipzig
XIX (2nd Royal Saxon) Corps	24th (2nd Royal Saxon) Division	24th (2nd Royal Saxon) Field Artillery Brigade	78th (8th Royal Saxon) Field Artillery	Wurzen
XIX (2nd Royal Saxon) Corps	24th (2nd Royal Saxon) Division	24th (2nd Royal Saxon) Cavalry Brigade	19th (2nd Royal Saxon) Hussars "Queen Carola"	Grimma
XIX (2nd Royal Saxon) Corps	24th (2nd Royal Saxon) Division	24th (2nd Royal Saxon) Cavalry Brigade	18th (2nd Royal Saxon) Uhlans	Leipzig
XIX (2nd Royal Saxon) Corps	40th (4th Royal Saxon) Division	88th (7th Royal Saxon) Infantry Brigade	104th (5th Royal Saxon) Infantry "Crown Prince"	Chemnitz
XIX (2nd Royal Saxon) Corps	40th (4th Royal Saxon) Division	88th (7th Royal Saxon) Infantry Brigade	181st (15th Royal Saxon) Infantry	Chemnitz, III Bn Glauchau
XIX (2nd Royal Saxon) Corps	40th (4th Royal Saxon) Division	89th (8th Royal Saxon) Infantry Brigade	133rd (9th Royal Saxon) Infantry	Zwickau
XIX (2nd Royal Saxon) Corps	40th (4th Royal Saxon) Division	89th (8th Royal Saxon) Infantry Brigade	134th (10th Royal Saxon) Infantry	Plauen
XIX (2nd Royal Saxon) Corps	40th (4th Royal Saxon) Division	40th (4th Royal Saxon) Field Artillery Brigade	32nd (3rd Royal Saxon) Field Artillery	Riesa
XIX (2nd Royal Saxon) Corps	40th (4th Royal Saxon) Division	40th (4th Royal Saxon) Field Artillery Brigade	68th (6th Royal Saxon) Field Artillery	Riesa
XIX (2nd Royal Saxon) Corps	40th (4th Royal Saxon) Division	40th (4th Royal Saxon) Cavalry Brigade	Carabiniers (2nd Royal Saxon Heavy Cavalry)	Borna
XIX (2nd Royal Saxon) Corps	40th (4th Royal Saxon) Division	40th (4th Royal Saxon) Cavalry Brigade	21st (3rd Royal Saxon) Uhlans	Chemnitz
XIX (2nd Royal Saxon) Corps	Corps Troops		8th (Royal Saxon) Machine Gun Abteilung	Leipzig
XIX (2nd Royal Saxon) Corps	Corps Troops		22nd (2nd Royal Saxon) Pioneer Battalion	Riesa
XIX (2nd Royal Saxon) Corps	Corps Troops		19th (2nd Royal Saxon) Train Battalion	Leipzig
XIX (2nd Royal Saxon) Corps	Chemnitz Defence Command (Landwehr-Inspektion)			Chemnitz

== World War I ==
=== Organisation on mobilisation ===
On mobilization on 2 August 1914 the Corps was restructured. 40th Cavalry Brigade was withdrawn to form part of the 8th Cavalry Division and the 24th Cavalry Brigade was broken up and its regiments assigned to the divisions as reconnaissance units. Divisions received engineer companies and other support units from the Corps headquarters. In summary, XIX Corps mobilised with 25 infantry battalions, 9 machine gun companies (54 machine guns), 8 cavalry squadrons, 24 field artillery batteries (144 guns), 4 heavy artillery batteries (16 guns), 3 pioneer companies and an aviation detachment.

Initial wartime organization of the Corps
Corps	Division	Brigade	Units
XIX (2nd Royal Saxon) Corps	24th (2nd Royal Saxon) Division	47th Infantry Brigade	139th Infantry Regiment
XIX (2nd Royal Saxon) Corps	24th (2nd Royal Saxon) Division	47th Infantry Brigade	179th Infantry Regiment
XIX (2nd Royal Saxon) Corps	24th (2nd Royal Saxon) Division	47th Infantry Brigade	13th Jäger Battalion
XIX (2nd Royal Saxon) Corps	24th (2nd Royal Saxon) Division	48th Infantry Brigade	106th Infantry Regiment
XIX (2nd Royal Saxon) Corps	24th (2nd Royal Saxon) Division	48th Infantry Brigade	107th Infantry Regiment
XIX (2nd Royal Saxon) Corps	24th (2nd Royal Saxon) Division	24th Field Artillery Brigade	77th Field Artillery Regiment
XIX (2nd Royal Saxon) Corps	24th (2nd Royal Saxon) Division	24th Field Artillery Brigade	78th Field Artillery Regiment
XIX (2nd Royal Saxon) Corps	24th (2nd Royal Saxon) Division		18th Uhlan Regiment
XIX (2nd Royal Saxon) Corps	24th (2nd Royal Saxon) Division		1st Company, 22nd Pioneer Battalion
XIX (2nd Royal Saxon) Corps	24th (2nd Royal Saxon) Division		24th Divisional Pontoon Train
XIX (2nd Royal Saxon) Corps	24th (2nd Royal Saxon) Division		1st Medical Company
XIX (2nd Royal Saxon) Corps	24th (2nd Royal Saxon) Division		3rd Medical Company
XIX (2nd Royal Saxon) Corps	40th (4th Royal Saxon) Division	88th Infantry Brigade	104th Infantry Regiment
XIX (2nd Royal Saxon) Corps	40th (4th Royal Saxon) Division	88th Infantry Brigade	181st Infantry Regiment
XIX (2nd Royal Saxon) Corps	40th (4th Royal Saxon) Division	89th Infantry Brigade	133rd Infantry Regiment
XIX (2nd Royal Saxon) Corps	40th (4th Royal Saxon) Division	89th Infantry Brigade	134th Infantry Regiment
XIX (2nd Royal Saxon) Corps	40th (4th Royal Saxon) Division	40th Field Artillery Brigade	32nd Field Artillery Regiment
XIX (2nd Royal Saxon) Corps	40th (4th Royal Saxon) Division	40th Field Artillery Brigade	68th Field Artillery Regiment
XIX (2nd Royal Saxon) Corps	40th (4th Royal Saxon) Division		19th Hussar Regiment
XIX (2nd Royal Saxon) Corps	40th (4th Royal Saxon) Division		2nd Company, 22nd Pioneer Battalion
XIX (2nd Royal Saxon) Corps	40th (4th Royal Saxon) Division		3rd Company, 22nd Pioneer Battalion
XIX (2nd Royal Saxon) Corps	40th (4th Royal Saxon) Division		40th Divisional Pontoon Train
XIX (2nd Royal Saxon) Corps	40th (4th Royal Saxon) Division		2nd Medical Company
XIX (2nd Royal Saxon) Corps	Corps Troops		II Battalion, 19th Foot Artillery Regiment
XIX (2nd Royal Saxon) Corps	Corps Troops		24th Aviation Detachment
XIX (2nd Royal Saxon) Corps	Corps Troops		19th Corps Pontoon Train
XIX (2nd Royal Saxon) Corps	Corps Troops		19th Telephone Detachment
XIX (2nd Royal Saxon) Corps	Corps Troops		22nd Pioneer Searchlight Section
XIX (2nd Royal Saxon) Corps	Corps Troops		Munition Trains and Columns corresponding to II Corps

=== Combat chronicle ===
On mobilisation, XIX Corps was assigned to the predominantly Saxon 3rd Army forming part of the right wing of the forces for the Schlieffen Plan offensive in August 1914 on the Western Front. It spent the entire war on the Western Front. It was still in existence at the end of the war in the 19th Army, Heeresgruppe Herzog Albrecht von Württemberg.

== Commanders ==
The XIX Corps had the following commanders during its existence:

Dates	Rank	Name
25 March 1899 to 21 April 1904	General der Infanterie	Heinrich Leo von Treitschke
22 April 1904 to 26 November 1907	General der Infanterie	Alexander Graf Vitzthum von Eckstädt
27 November 1907 to 27 November 1913	General der Artillerie	Hans von Kirchbach
30 November 1913 to 20 July 1917	General der Kavallerie	Maximilian von Laffert
8 August 1917 to 8 August 1918	General der Infanterie	Adolph von Carlowitz
9 August 1918 to end of the war	Generalleutnant	Karl Lucius

== See also ==
- German Army order of battle (1914)
- German Army order of battle, Western Front (1918)
- List of Imperial German infantry regiments
- List of Imperial German artillery regiments
- List of Imperial German cavalry regiments
- Royal Saxon Army
