= List of Imperial German artillery regiments =

This is a list of Imperial German artillery regiments before and during World War I. In peacetime, the Imperial German Army included 100 regiments of Field artillery (plus the Lehr instruction unit) and 24 regiments of Foot artillery (plus another Lehr instruction unit) who operated the heavier pieces. Some of these regiments had a history stretching back to the 17th century, while others were only formed as late as October 1912.

== Field Artillery Regiments ==
Regiment	Raised	Garrison	Corps
1st Guards Field Artillery	29 February 1816	Berlin	Guards Corps
2nd Guards Field Artillery	24 October 1872	Potsdam	Guards Corps
3rd Guards Field Artillery	25 March 1899	Berlin, Beeskow	Guards Corps
4th Guards Field Artillery	25 March 1899	Potsdam	Guards Corps
1st (1st Lithuanian) Field Artillery "Prince August of Prussia"	1 October 1772	Gumbinnen, Insterburg	I Army Corps
2nd (1st Pomeranian) Field Artillery	24 November 1808	Kolberg, Belgard	II Army Corps
3rd (1st Brandenburg) Field Artillery "General-Feldzeugmeister"	29 February 1816	Brandenburg	III Army Corps
4th (Magdeburg) Field Artillery "Prince Regent Luitpold of Bavaria"	29 February 1816	Magdeburg	IV Army Corps
5th (1st Lower Silesian) Field Artillery "von Podbielski"	29 February 1816	Sprottau, Sagan	V Army Corps
6th (1st Silesian) Field Artillery "von Peucker"	24 November 1808	Breslau	VI Army Corps
7th (1st Westphalian) Field Artillery	29 February 1816	Wesel, Düsseldorf	VII Army Corps
8th (1st Rhenish) Field Artillery "von Holtzendorff"	29 February 1816	Saarbrücken, Saarlouis	XXI Army Corps
9th (Schleswig) Field Artillery "General Field Marshal Graf Waldersee"	29 July 1866	Itzehoe	IX Army Corps
10th (1st Hannover) Field Artillery "von Scharnhorst"	19 December 1803	Hannover	X Army Corps
11th (1st Kurhessian) Field Artillery	22 November 1813	Kassel, Fritzlar	XI Army Corps
12th (1st Royal Saxon) Field Artillery	26 June 1620	Dresden, Königsbrück	XII Army Corps
13th (1st Württemberg) Field Artillery "King Charles"	24 March 1736	Ulm, Cannstatt	XIII Army Corps
14th (1st Baden) Field Artillery "Grand Duke"	21 January 1850	Karlsruhe	XIV Army Corps
15th (1st Upper Alsatian) Field Artillery	19 May 1871	Saarburg, Mörchingen	XXI Army Corps
16th (1st East Prussian) Field Artillery	24 October 1872	Königsberg	I Army Corps
17th (2nd Pomeranian) Field Artillery	24 October 1872	Bromberg	II Army Corps
18th (2nd Brandenburg) Field Artillery "General-Feldzeugmeister"	24 October 1872	Frankfurt/Oder	III Army Corps
19th (1st Thuringian) Field Artillery	24 October 1872	Erfurt	XI Army Corps
20th (1st Posen) Field Artillery	24 October 1872	Posen	V Army Corps
21st (1st Upper Silesian) Field Artillery "von Clausewitz"	24 October 1872	Neiße, Grottkau	VI Army Corps
22nd (2nd Westphalian) Field Artillery	24 October 1872	Münster	VII Army Corps
23rd (2nd Rhenish) Field Artillery	24 October 1872	Koblenz	VIII Army Corps
24th (Holstein) Field Artillery	24 October 1872	Güstrow, Neustrelitz	IX Army Corps
25th (1st Grand Ducal Hessian) Field Artillery	7 April 1790	Darmstadt	XVIII Army Corps
26th (2nd Hannover) Field Artillery	24 October 1872	Verden	X Army Corps
27th (1st Nassau) Field Artillery "Oranien"	15 March 1833	Mainz, Wiesbaden	XVIII Army Corps
28th (2nd Royal Saxon) Field Artillery	1 November 1872	Pirna	XII Army Corps
29th (2nd Württemberg) Field Artillery "Prince Regent Luitpold of Bavaria"	24 March 1736	Ludwigsburg	XIII Army Corps
30th (2nd Baden) Field Artillery	24 October 1872	Rastatt	XIV Army Corps
31st (1st Lower Alsatian) Field Artillery	23 April 1881	Hagenau	XXI Army Corps
32nd (3rd Royal Saxon) Field Artillery	1 February 1889	Riesa	XIX Army Corps
33rd (1st Lotharingian) Field Artillery	1 February 1890	Metz	XVI Army Corps
34th (2nd Lotharingian) Field Artillery	1 February 1890	Metz	XVI Army Corps
35th (1st West Prussian) Field Artillery	1 February 1890	Deutsch-Eylau	XX Army Corps
36th (2nd West Prussian) Field Artillery	1 February 1890	Danzig	XVII Army Corps
37th (2nd Lithuanian) Field Artillery	25 March 1899	Insterburg	I Army Corps
38th (Vorpommersches) Field Artillery	25 March 1899	Stettin	II Army Corps
39th (Kurmark) Field Artillery	25 March 1899	Perleberg	III Army Corps
40th (Altmark) Field Artillery	25 March 1899	Burg	IV Army Corps
41st (2nd Lower Silesian) Field Artillery	25 March 1899	Glogau	V Army Corps
42nd (2nd Silesian) Field Artillery	25 March 1899	Schweidnitz	VI Army Corps
43rd (Cleve) Field Artillery	25 March 1899	Wesel	VII Army Corps
44th (Trier) Field Artillery	25 March 1899	Trier	VIII Army Corps
45th (Lauenburg) Field Artillery	25 March 1899	Altona, Rendsburg	IX Army Corps
46th (Lower Saxony) Field Artillery	25 March 1899	Wolfenbüttel, Celle	X Army Corps
47th (2nd Kurhessian) Field Artillery	25 March 1899	Fulda	XI Army Corps
48th (4th Royal Saxon) Field Artillery	25 March 1899	Dresden	XII Army Corps
49th (3rd Württemberg) Field Artillery	25 March 1899	Ulm	XIII Army Corps
50th (3rd Baden) Field Artillery	25 March 1899	Karlsruhe	XIV Army Corps
51st (2nd Upper Alsatian) Field Artillery	25 March 1899	Straßburg	XV Army Corps
52nd (2nd East Prussian) Field Artillery	25 March 1899	Königsberg	I Army Corps
53rd (Hinterpommersches) Field Artillery	25 March 1899	Bromberg, Hohensalza	II Army Corps
54th (Neumark) Field Artillery	25 March 1899	Küstrin, Landsberg an der Warthe	III Army Corps
55th (2nd Thuringian) Field Artillery	25 March 1899	Naumburg an der Saale	XI Army Corps
56th (2nd Posen) Field Artillery	25 March 1899	Lissa	V Army Corps
57th (2nd Upper Silesian) Field Artillery	25 March 1899	Neustadt/Oberschlesien, Gleiwitz	VI Army Corps
58th (Minden) Field Artillery	25 March 1899	Minden	VII Army Corps
59th (Berg) Field Artillery	25 March 1899	Köln	VIII Army Corps
60th (Grand Ducal Mecklenburgian) Field Artillery	25 March 1899	Schwerin	IX Army Corps
61st (2nd Grand Ducal Hessian) Field Artillery	25 March 1899	Darmstadt, Babenhausen	XVIII Army Corps
62nd (East Frisisan) Field Artillery	25 March 1899	Oldenburg, Osnabrück	X Army Corps
63rd (2nd Nassau) Field Artillery	25 March 1899	Frankfurt/Main, Mainz	XVIII Army Corps
64th (5th Royal Saxon) Field Artillery	1 October 1901	Pirna	XII Army Corps
65th (4th Württemberg) Field Artillery	1 April 1899	Ludwigsburg	XIII Army Corps
66th (4th Baden) Field Artillery	25 March 1899	Lahr, Neubreisach	XV Army Corps
67th (2nd Lower Alsatian) Field Artillery	25 March 1899	Hagenau, Bischweiler	XXI Army Corps
68th (6th Royal Saxon) Field Artillery	25 March 1899	Riesa	XIX Army Corps
69th (3rd Lotharingian) Field Artillery	25 March 1899	St. Avold	XVI Army Corps
70th (4th Lotharingian) Field Artillery	25 March 1899	Metz, Saarlouis	XVI Army Corps
71st Field Artillery "Grand Komtur"	25 March 1899	Graudenz	XVII Army Corps
72nd Field Artillery "Grand Master"	25 March 1899	Marienwerder, Preußisch Stargard	XVII Army Corps
73rd (1st Masurian) Field Artillery	25 March 1899	Allenstein	XX Army Corps
74th (Torgau) Field Artillery	25 March 1899	Torgau, Wittenberg	IV Army Corps
75th (Mansfeld) Field Artillery	1 October 1899	Halle/Saale	IV Army Corps
76th (5th Baden) Field Artillery	1 October 1899	Freiburg im Breisgau	XIV Army Corps
77th (7th Royal Saxon) Field Artillery	1 October 1899	Leipzig	XIX Army Corps
78th (8th Royal Saxon) Field Artillery	1 October 1901	Wurzen	XIX Army Corps
79th (3rd East Prussian) Field Artillery	1 October 1912	Osterode	XX Army Corps
80th (3rd Upper Alsatian) Field Artillery	1 October 1912	Colmar, Neubreisach	XV Army Corps
81st (Thorn) Field Artillery	1 October 1912	Thorn	XVII Army Corps
82nd (2nd Masurian) Field Artillery	1 October 1912	Rastenburg, Lötzen	XX Army Corps
83rd (3rd Rhenish) Field Artillery	1 October 1912	Bonn, Düren	VIII Army Corps
84th (Straßburg) Field Artillery	1 October 1912	Straßburg	XV Army Corps
1st Royal Bavarian Field Artillery "Prince Regent Luitpold"	11 October 1824	Munich	I Royal Bavarian Corps
2nd Royal Bavarian Field Artillery "Horn"	16 March 1824	Würzburg	II Royal Bavarian Corps
3rd Royal Bavarian Field Artillery "Price Leopold"	30 March 1848	Amberg	III Royal Bavarian Corps
4th Royal Bavarian Field Artillery "King"	30 March 1859	Augsburg	I Royal Bavarian Corps
5th Royal Bavarian Field Artillery "King Alfons XIII of Spain"	1 October 1890	Landau	II Royal Bavarian Corps
6th Royal Bavarian Field Artillery "Price Ferdinand of Bourlon, Duke of Calabria"	1 October 1900	Fürth	III Royal Bavarian Corps
7th Royal Bavarian Field Artillery "Prince Regent Luitpold"	1 October 1900	Munich	I Royal Bavarian Corps
8th Royal Bavarian Field Artillery "Prince Heinrich of Prussia"	1 October 1900	Nuremberg	III Royal Bavarian Corps
9th Royal Bavarian Field Artillery	1 October 1901	Freising	I Royal Bavarian Corps
10th Royal Bavarian Field Artillery	1 October 1901	Erlangen	III Royal Bavarian Corps
11th Royal Bavarian Field Artillery	1 October 1901	Würzburg	II Royal Bavarian Corps
12th Royal Bavarian Field Artillery	1 October 1901	Landau	II Royal Bavarian Corps
Lehr Field Artillery	4 July 1867	Jüterbog	Guards Corps

== Foot Artillery Regiments ==
Regiment	Raised	Garrison	Corps
Guards Foot Artillery	16 March 1865	Spandau	Guards Corps
1st (East Prussian) Foot Artillery "von Linger"	16 June 1864	Königsberg, Lötzen	I Army Corps
2nd (1st Pomeranian) Foot Artillery "von Hindersin"	16 March 1865	Swinemünde, Emden	II Army Corps
3rd (Brandenburg) Foot Artillery "General-Feldzeugmeister"	16 June 1864	Mainz	XVIII Army Corps
4th (Magdeburg) Foot Artillery "Encke"	16 June 1864	Magdeburg	IV Army Corps
5th (Lower Silesian) Foot Artillery	16 March 1865	Posen	V Army Corps
6th (Silesian) Foot Artillery "von Dieskau"	16 March 1865	Neiße, Glogau	VI Army Corps
7th (Westphalian) Foot Artillery	16 June 1864	Köln	VII Army Corps
8th (Rhenish) Foot Artillery	16 June 1864	Metz	XVI Army Corps
9th (Schleswig-Holstein) Foot Artillery	11 August 1893	Ehrenbreitstein	VIII Army Corps
10th (Lower Saxony) Foot Artillery	19 May 1871	Straßburg	XV Army Corps
11th (1st West Prussian) Foot Artillery	24 March 1881	Thorn	XVII Army Corps
12th (1st Royal Saxon) Foot Artillery	1 July 1873	Metz	XVI Army Corps
13th (Hohenzollern) Foot Artillery	14 November 1805	Ulm, Breisach	XV Army Corps
14th (Baden) Foot Artillery	11 August 1893	Straßburg	XV Army Corps
15th (2nd Pomeranian) Foot Artillery	11 August 1893	Bromberg, Graudenz	II Army Corps
16th (Lotharingian) Foot Artillery	1 October 1912	Metz, Diedenhofen	XVI Army Corps
17th (2nd West Prussian) Foot Artillery	1 October 1912	Danzig, Pillau	XVII Army Corps
18th (Thuringian) Foot Artillery	1 October 1912	Niederzwehren bei Kassel	XI Army Corps
19th (2nd Royal Saxon) Foot Artillery	1 October 1912	Dresden	XII Army Corps
20th (Lauenburg) Foot Artillery	1 October 1912	Altona, Lockstedt (temp.)	IX Army Corps
1st Royal Bavarian Foot Artillery "vakant Bothmer"	1 January 1873	Munich, Neu-Ulm	I Royal Bavarian Corps
2nd Royal Bavarian Foot Artillery	1 January 1873	Metz	II Royal Bavarian Corps
3rd Royal Bavarian Foot Artillery	1 October 1912	Ingolstadt	III Royal Bavarian Corps
Lehr Foot Artillery	1 October 1912	Jüterbog	Guards Corps

== See also ==
- Bavarian Army
- German Army (German Empire)
- List of Imperial German infantry regiments
- List of Imperial German cavalry regiments

== Bibliography ==
- Cron, Hermann (2002). Imperial German Army 1914–18: Organisation, Structure, Orders-of-Battle [first published: 1937]. Helion & Co. ISBN 1-874622-70-1.
- Tessin, Georg (1974). Deutsche Verbände und Truppen, 1918 – 1939. Biblio Osnabrück. ISBN 3-7648-1000-9.
- The German Forces in the Field; 7th Revision, 11th November 1918; Compiled by the General Staff, War Office. Imperial War Museum, London and the Battery Press. 1995 [1918]. ISBN 978-1-870423-95-3.
