= 1st Royal Saxon Guards Heavy Cavalry =

Military unit

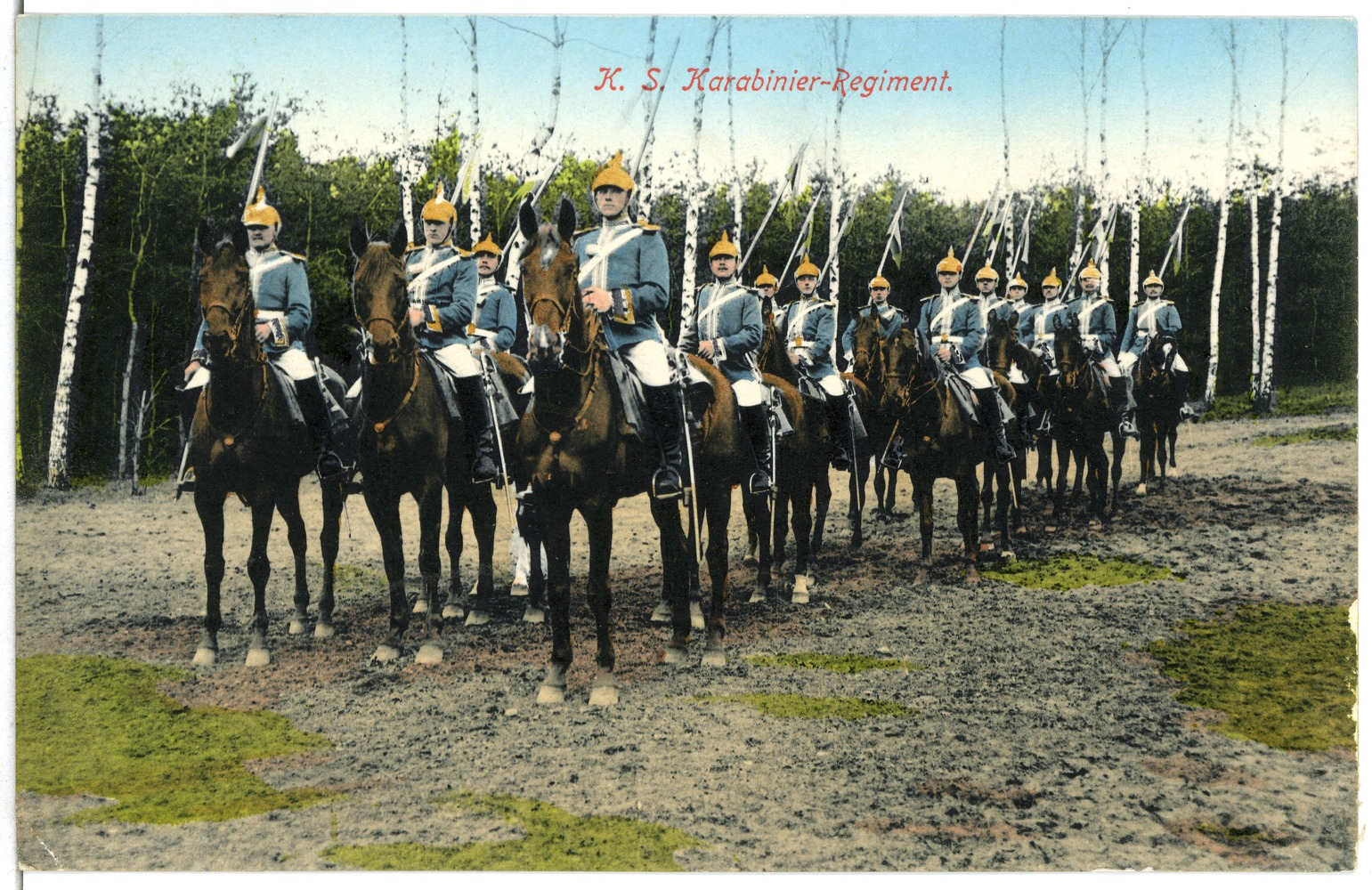
A regiment of the 1st Royal Saxon Guards Heavy Cavalry. Dresden, 1906.

The 1st Royal Saxon Guards Heavy Cavalry (Garde-Reiter-Regiment (1. Schweres Regiment)) was a heavy cavalry of the Royal Saxon Army. Established in 1680 as a cuirassier unit, the regiment fought in the Battle of Vienna (1683), the Nine Years' War, the War of the Spanish Succession, the Silesian Wars, the Napoleonic Wars, the Austro-Prussian War, the Franco-Prussian War and World War I. The regiment was disbanded in 1919.

== See also ==
- List of Imperial German cavalry regiments
