= Karl von Einem =

Prussian Minister of War

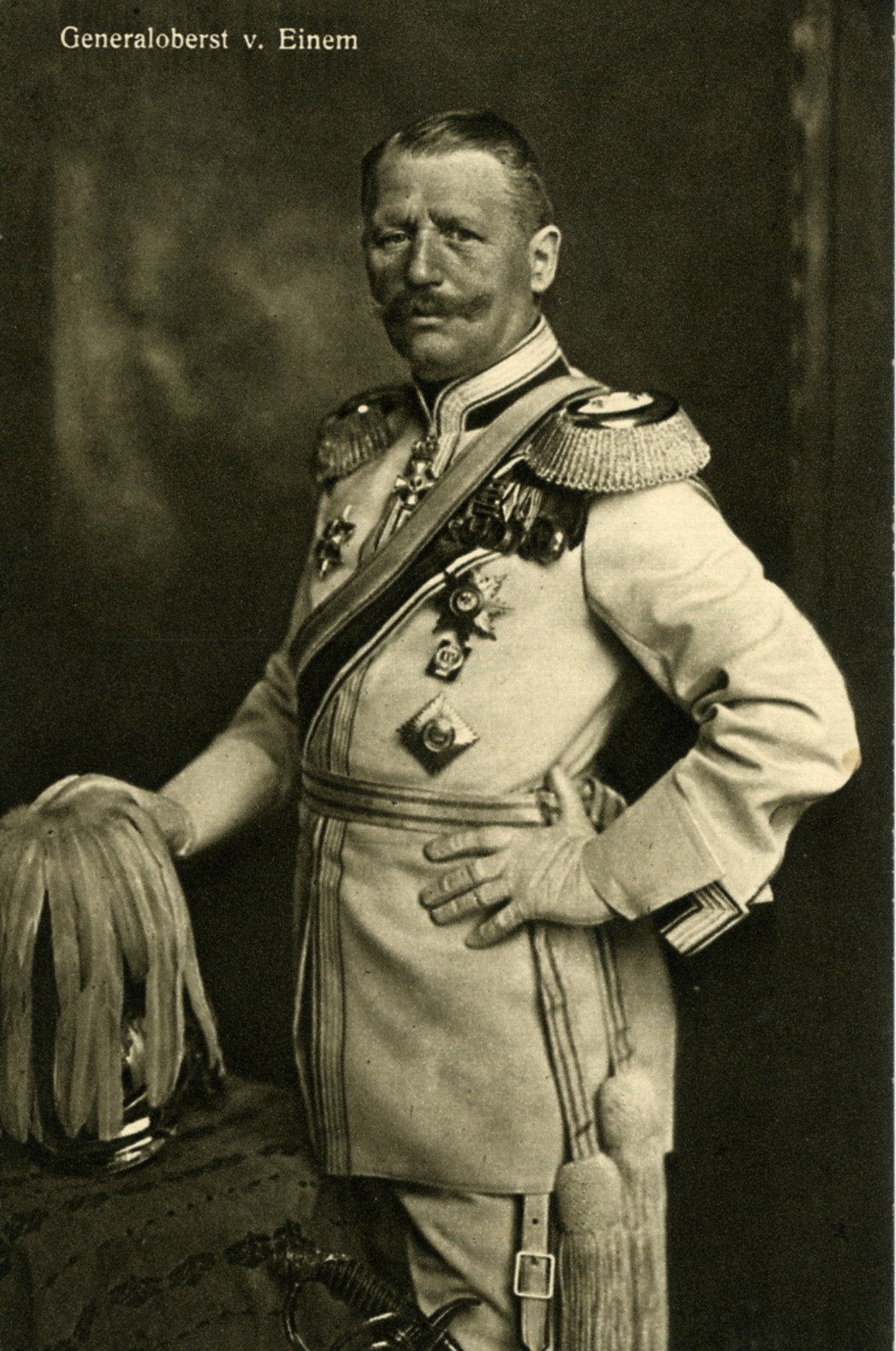
- Born: 1 January 1853; Herzberg am Harz, Kingdom of Hanover, German Confederation
- Died: 7 April 1934 (aged 81); Mülheim, Nazi Germany
- Military career
- Allegiance: Kingdom of Prussia; German Empire
- Branch: Prussian Army
- Service years: 1870–1919
- Rank: Generaloberst
- Commands: VII Army Corps; 3rd Army
- Conflicts: Franco-Prussian War; World War I
- Other work: Prussian Minister of War (1903–1909)

Karl Wilhelm Georg August von Einem genannt von Rothmaler (1 January 1853 – 7 April 1934) was the commander of the German 3rd Army during the First World War and served as the Prussian Minister of War responsible for much of the German military buildup prior to the outbreak of the war.

== Life and career ==
Born in Herzberg am Harz, Einem served in the Prussian army for much of his life when he was appointed Minister of War in 1903. During his six years of service, Einem oversaw the reorganization of the German army building much of the military's heavy armament in preparation for modern warfare, specifically the introduction of the machine gun and modern heavy artillery.

In 1909, Einem was appointed commander of VII Corps serving under the command of Gen. Karl von Bülow's 2nd Army later taking part in the First Battle of the Marne soon after German entry into World War I in August 1914.

Assigned to France, Einem succeeded Gen. Max von Hausen as commander of the Third Army in September 1914. Successfully repulsing the French Champagne-Marne offensive from February–March and September–November 1915 respectively, Einem would take part in all three Battles of the Aisne and would hold Gen. Anthoine's 4th Army (under Gen. Philippe Petain's Center Army Group) during the Second Battle of the Aisne as part of the Nivelle Offensive from 16 April to 15 May 1917.

Einem's right wing units would also participate in Gen. Erich Ludendorff's Champagne-Marne offensive on 15–17 July 1918 supporting the east flank of the German 1st Army. After suffering severe casualties in battle with Gen. John J. Pershing's Allied Expeditionary Force from 26 September to 11 November in the Meuse-Argonne offensive, he was forced to retreat northward shortly before the war's end. On 10 November 1918, only one day before the declaration of the Armistice, command of Prince Wilhelm's Army Group German Crown Prince fell to Einem who would oversee Germany's demobilization. Retiring from the army in 1919, Einem lived in retirement until his death in Mülheim on 7 April 1934.

== Awards and decorations ==
- Order of the Black Eagle with Chain
- Order of the Red Eagle, 2nd class with Oak Leaves and Crown
- Order of the Crown, 2nd class with Star (Prussia)
- Star of the Commanders of the Royal House Order of Hohenzollern with Swords
- Knight of Justice of the Order of Saint John (Bailiwick of Brandenburg)
- Iron Cross (1870), 2nd class on black ribbon
- Iron Cross (1914), 1st class
- Pour le Mérite (16 March 1915), Oak Leaves added on 17 October 1916
- Grand Cross with Crown of the Merit Order of Philip the Magnanimous (8 September 1905)
- Commander First Class of the Military Order of St. Henry (15 October 1918)

Political offices
| Preceded by Heinrich von Gossler | Prussian Minister of War; 1903–1909 | Succeeded by Josias von Heeringen |
Military offices
| Preceded by Generaloberst Max von Hausen | Commander, 3rd Army; 12 September 1914 – 30 January 1919 | Succeeded by Dissolved |
