= 40th Division (German Empire) =

40th Division (40. Division)
- Active: 1899-1919
- Country: Saxony/Germany
- Branch: Army
- Type: Infantry (in peacetime included cavalry)
- Size: Approx. 15,000
- Part of: XIX. (2nd Royal Saxon) Army Corps (XIX. (2. Königl. Sächs.) Armeekorps)
- Garrison/HQ: Chemnitz
- Engagements: World War I: Great Retreat, Battle of the Marne, Race to the Sea, Battle of the Somme, Passchendaele

The 40th Division (40. Division), formally the 4th Division No. 40 (4. Division Nr. 40) was a unit of the Saxon Army, a component of the Imperial German Army. The division was formed on April 1, 1899, and was headquartered in Chemnitz. The division was subordinated in peacetime to the XIX (2nd Royal Saxon) Army Corps (XIX. (2. Königlich Sächsisches) Armeekorps). The division was disbanded in 1919 during the demobilization of the German Army after World War I. The division was recruited in the western part of the Kingdom of Saxony.

== World War I ==
During World War I, the division fought on the Western Front, seeing action in the Allied Great Retreat which culminated in the First Battle of the Marne and the Race to the Sea. It then spent the next several years in the trenches. In 1916, it fought in the Battle of the Somme. In 1917, it participated in the Battle of Passchendaele. In 1918, it fought against the various Allied offensives and counteroffensives. Allied intelligence rated the division as second class until 1918, but downgraded it to third class that year.

== Pre-World War I organization ==
The organization of the 40th Division in 1914, shortly before the outbreak of World War I, was as follows:

- 7. Infanterie-Brigade Nr. 88 (88. Infanterie-Brigade)
  - 5. Infanterie-Regiment Kronprinz Nr. 104
  - 15. Infanterie-Regiment Nr. 181
- 8. Infanterie-Brigade Nr. 89 (89. Infanterie-Brigade)
  - 9. Infanterie-Regiment Nr. 133
  - 10. Infanterie-Regiment Nr. 134
- 4. Kavallerie-Brigade Nr. 40 (40. Kavallerie-Brigade)
  - Karabinier-Regiment
  - 3. Ulanen-Regiment Kaiser Wilhelm II., König von Preußen Nr. 21
- 4. Feldartillerie-Brigade Nr. 40 (40. Feldartillerie-Brigade)
  - 3. Feld-Artillerie-Regiment Nr. 32
  - 6. Feld-Artillerie-Regiment Nr. 68

== Order of battle on mobilization ==
On mobilization in August 1914 at the beginning of World War I, most divisional cavalry, including brigade headquarters, was withdrawn to form cavalry divisions or split up among divisions as reconnaissance units. Divisions received engineer companies and other support units from their higher headquarters. The 40th Division was redesignated the 40th Infantry Division. Its initial wartime organization was as follows:

- 7. Infanterie-Brigade Nr. 88 (88. Infanterie-Brigade)
  - 5. Infanterie-Regiment Kronprinz Nr. 104
  - 15. Infanterie-Regiment Nr. 181
- 8. Infanterie-Brigade Nr. 89 (89. Infanterie-Brigade)
  - 9. Infanterie-Regiment Nr. 133
  - 10. Infanterie-Regiment Nr. 134
- 2. Husaren-Regiment Nr. 19
- 4. Feldartillerie-Brigade Nr. 40 (40. Feldartillerie-Brigade)
  - 3. Feld-Artillerie-Regiment Nr. 32
  - 6. Feld-Artillerie-Regiment Nr. 68
- 2.Kompanie/2. Pionier-Bataillon Nr. 22
- 3.Kompanie/2. Pionier-Bataillon Nr. 22

== Late World War I organization ==
Divisions underwent many changes during the war, with regiments moving from division to division, and some being destroyed and rebuilt. During the war, most divisions became triangular - one infantry brigade with three infantry regiments rather than two infantry brigades of two regiments (a "square division"). An artillery commander replaced the artillery brigade headquarters, the cavalry was further reduced, the engineer contingent was increased, and a divisional signals command was created. The 40th Infantry Division's order of battle on January 1, 1918, was as follows:

- 7. Infanterie-Brigade Nr. 88 (88. Infanterie-Brigade)
  - 5. Infanterie-Regiment Kronprinz Nr. 104
  - 10. Infanterie-Regiment Nr. 134
  - 15. Infanterie-Regiment Nr. 181
- 2. Eskadron/Kgl. Sächs. 2. Husaren-Regiment Nr. 19
- Artillerie-Kommandeur 40:
  - 3. Feld-Artillerie-Regiment Nr. 32
  - Fußartillerie-Bataillon Nr. 403 (from July 5, 1918)
- Stab Pionier-Bataillon Nr. 141:
  - 3.Kompanie/2. Pionier-Bataillon Nr. 22
  - Reserve-Pionier-Kompanie Nr. 54
  - Minenwerfer-Kompanie Nr. 40
- Divisions-Nachrichten-Kommandeur 40
