= 32nd Division (German Empire) =

32nd Division (32. Division)
- Active: 1887-1919
- Country: Saxony/Germany
- Branch: Army
- Type: Infantry (in peacetime included cavalry)
- Size: Approx. 15,000
- Part of: XII. (1st Royal Saxon) Army Corps
- Garrison/HQ: Dresden
- Engagements: World War I: Great Retreat, Battle of the Marne, Second Battle of the Aisne, Passchendaele, Meuse-Argonne Offensive

Sealing Stump of 32nd Division (German Empire)

The 32nd Division (32. Division), formally the 3rd Division No. 32 (3. Division Nr. 32) was a unit of the Saxon Army, a component of the Imperial German Army. The division was formed on April 1, 1887, and was headquartered in Bautzen. The division was subordinated in peacetime to the XII (1st Royal Saxon) Army Corps (XII. (1. Königlich Sächsisches) Armeekorps). The division was disbanded in 1919 during the demobilization of the German Army after World War I. The division was recruited in the eastern part of the Kingdom of Saxony.

== Combat chronicle ==
During World War I, the division fought on the Western Front, seeing action in the Allied Great Retreat which culminated in the First Battle of the Marne. It then spent the next several years in the trenches. In 1917, it fought in the Second Battle of the Aisne, also known as the Third Battle of Champagne (and to the Germans, as the Double Battle of Aisne-Champagne), and in the Battle of Passchendaele. In 1918, it fought against the Allied Meuse-Argonne Offensive. Allied intelligence rated the division third class in 1918.

== Pre-World War I organization ==
The organization of the 32nd Division in 1914, shortly before the outbreak of World War I, was as follows:

- 5. Infanterie-Brigade Nr. 63 (63. Infanterie-Brigade)
  - 3. Infanterie-Regiment König Ludwig III von Bayern Nr. 102
  - 4. Infanterie-Regiment Nr. 103
  - 1. Jäger-Bataillon Nr. 12 (from 1.10.14)
- 6. Infanterie-Brigade Nr. 64 (64. Infanterie-Brigade)
  - 12. Infanterie-Regiment Nr. 177
  - 13. Infanterie-Regiment Nr. 178
  - 2. Jäger-Bataillon Nr. 13 (to 1.10.14)
- 3. Kavallerie-Brigade Nr. 32 (32. Kavallerie-Brigade)
  - 1. Husaren-Regiment, "König Albert" Nr. 18
  - 3. Husaren-Regiment Nr. 20
- 3. Feldartillerie-Brigade Nr. 32 (32. Feldartillerie-Brigade)
  - 2. Feldartillerie-Regiment Nr. 28
  - 5. Feldartillerie-Regiment Nr. 64

== Order of battle on mobilization ==
On mobilization in August 1914 at the beginning of World War I, most divisional cavalry, including brigade headquarters, was withdrawn to form cavalry divisions or split up among divisions as reconnaissance units. Divisions received engineer companies and other support units from their higher headquarters. The 32nd Division was redesignated the 32nd Infantry Division. Its initial wartime organization was as follows:

- 5. Infanterie-Brigade Nr. 63 (63. Infanterie-Brigade)
  - 3. Infanterie-Regiment König Ludwig III von Bayern Nr. 102
  - 4. Infanterie-Regiment Nr. 103
- 6. Infanterie-Brigade Nr. 64 (64. Infanterie-Brigade)
  - 12. Infanterie-Regiment Nr. 177
  - 13. Infanterie-Regiment Nr. 178
- 1. Husaren-Regiment "König Albert" Nr. 18
- 3. Feldartillerie-Brigade Nr. 32 (32. Feldartillerie-Brigade)
  - 2. Feldartillerie-Regiment Nr. 28
  - 5. Feldartillerie-Regiment Nr. 64
- 2.Kompanie/1. Pionier-Bataillon Nr. 12
- 3.Kompanie/1. Pionier-Bataillon Nr. 12

== Late World War I organization ==
Divisions underwent many changes during the war, with regiments moving from division to division, and some being destroyed and rebuilt. During the war, most divisions became triangular - one infantry brigade with three infantry regiments rather than two infantry brigades of two regiments (a "square division"). An artillery commander replaced the artillery brigade headquarters, the cavalry was further reduced, the engineer contingent was increased, and a divisional signals command was created. The 32nd Infantry Division's order of battle on January 1, 1918, was as follows:

- 5. Infanterie-Brigade Nr. 63 (63. Infanterie-Brigade)
  - 3. Infanterie-Regiment König Ludwig III von Bayern Nr. 102
  - 4. Infanterie-Regiment Nr. 103
  - 12. Infanterie-Regiment Nr. 177
- 4.Eskadron/3. Husaren-Regiment Nr. 20
- Artillerie-Kommandeur 32
  - 5. Feldartillerie-Regiment Nr. 64
  - Fußartillerie-Bataillon Nr. 80 (from April 3, 1918)
- Stab Pionier-Bataillon Nr. 140
  - 2.Kompanie/1. Pionier-Bataillon Nr. 12
  - 5.Kompanie/1. Pionier-Bataillon Nr. 12
  - 3.Reserve-Kompanie/1. Pionier-Bataillon Nr. 12
  - Minenwerfer-Kompanie Nr. 32
- Divisions-Nachrichten-Kommandeur 32
