= 3rd Army (German Empire) =

3. Armee; 3rd Army
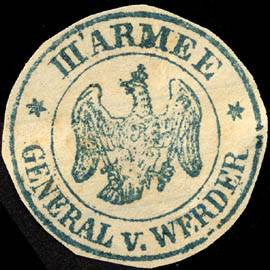
- Seal mark of the 3rd Army
- Active: 2 August 1914 – 30 January 1919
- Country: German Empire
- Type: Field Army
- Engagements: World War I: Western Front; Battle of the Frontiers; Battle of Charleroi; First Battle of the Marne; First Battle of the Aisne; Second Battle of the Aisne; Nivelle Offensive; Meuse-Argonne Offensive

Insignia
- Abbreviation: A.O.K. 3

The 3rd Army (German: 3. Armee / Armeeoberkommando 3 / A.O.K. 3) was an army level command of the German Army in World War I. It was formed on mobilization in August 1914 seemingly from the II Army Inspectorate. The army was disbanded in 1919 during demobilization after the war.

== History ==
Upon the mobilization Max von Hausen (Saxon War Minister) was given command of the 3rd Army which mainly consisted of Saxons. The army participated in the Battle of the Frontiers, mainly in the Battle of Dinant and the Battle of Charleroi and the army were responsible for the destruction of Reims in September 1914. When the 2nd Army retreated after the First Battle of the Marne, Hausen saw his flank exposed and ordered a retreat. Upon the stabilization of the front on the river Aisne, Hausen was relieved of his command and replaced by General Karl von Einem.

Repulsing the French First Battle of Champagne (the Champagne-Marne offensive) from February–March and Second Battle of Champagne (September–November) 1915 respectively, the 3rd Army took part in all three battles of the Aisne and defeated the Fourth Army (General Anthoine) part of Groupe d'armées du Centre (General Philippe Petain) during the Second Battle of the Aisne as part of the Nivelle Offensive from 16 April – 15 May 1917.

Einem's right flank units participate in the Champagne-Marne offensive on 15–17 July 1918 supporting the east flank of the 1st Army. After suffering severe casualties in battle with the American Expeditionary Force (General of the Armies John J. Pershing) from 26 September – 11 November in the Meuse-Argonne offensive, the army was forced to retreat northwards shortly before the war ended, when it was part of Heeresgruppe Deutscher Kronprinz.

=== Order of Battle, 30 October 1918 ===
Organization of 3rd Army on 30 October 1918
Army	Corps	Division
3rd Army	XXV Reserve Corps	9th Landwehr Division
3rd Army	XXV Reserve Corps	199th Division
3rd Army	XXV Reserve Corps	3rd Guards Division
3rd Army	XXV Reserve Corps	1st Guards Division
3rd Army	XVI Corps	213th Division
3rd Army	XVI Corps	242nd Division
3rd Army	XVI Corps	1st Bavarian Division
3rd Army	I Reserve Corps	202nd Division
3rd Army	I Reserve Corps	14th Reserve Division
3rd Army	I Reserve Corps	203rd Division
3rd Army	I Reserve Corps	195th Division
3rd Army	I Reserve Corps	76th Reserve Division
3rd Army	I Reserve Corps	42nd Division
3rd Army	I Reserve Corps	103rd Division
3rd Army	XXXVIII Reserve Corps	No units assigned
3rd Army	Moving to Bavaria	4th Bavarian Division

== Commanders ==
The 3rd Army had the following commanders during its existence:

3rd Army
From	Commander	Previously	Subsequently
2 August 1914	Generaloberst Max von Hausen	Saxon Minister of War	Adjutant to his Majesty the King of Saxony
12 September 1914	General der Kavallerie Karl von Einem	VII Corps	Retired
27 January 1915	Generaloberst Karl von Einem	VII Corps	Retired

== Glossary ==
- Armee-Abteilung (Army Detachment) in the sense of "something detached from an army". It is not under the command of an army being a small army.
- Armee-Gruppe (Army Group) a group within an army and under its command, generally formed as a temporary measure for a task.
- Heeresgruppe (Army Group) several armies under a commander.

== See also ==
- 3rd Army (Wehrmacht) for the equivalent formation in World War II
- German Army order of battle (1914)
- German Army order of battle, Western Front (1918)
- Schlieffen Plan

== Bibliography ==
- Cron, Hermann (2002) [1937]. Imperial German Army 1914–18: Organisation, Structure, Orders-of-Battle. Helion & Co. ISBN 1-874622-70-1.
- Ellis, John; Cox, Michael (1993). The World War I Databook. Aurum Press. ISBN 1-85410-766-6.
