= 31st Division (German Empire) =

31st Division (31. Division); from August 2, 1914, 31st Infantry Division (31. Infanterie-Division)
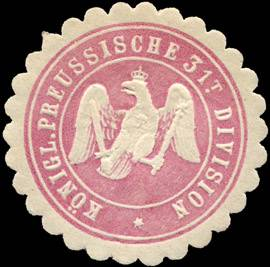
- Seal mark of the division
- Active: 20 March 1871-1919
- Country: Prussia/German Empire
- Branch: Imperial German Army
- Type: Infantry (in peacetime included cavalry)
- Size: Approx. 15,000 men
- Part of: XXI. Army Corps (XXI. Armeekorps)
- Garrison/HQ: Strasbourg (1871-1912); Saarbrücken (1912-1919)
- Engagements: World War I: Battle of the Frontiers; Race to the Sea; Gorlice-Tarnów Offensive; German spring offensive, Battle of the Lys; Battle of Saint-Mihiel

The 31st Division (31. Division) was a unit of the Prussian/German Army. It was formed on March 20, 1871, and was headquartered in Straßburg (now Strasbourg, France) until 1912, and then in Saarbrücken. The division was subordinated in peacetime to the XV Army Corps (XV. Armeekorps) until 1912, and then to the XXI Army Corps (XXI. Armeekorps). The division was disbanded in 1919 during the demobilization of the German Army after World War I. The division was recruited primarily in the southern part of the Rhine Province, but during World War I also drew replacements from Westphalia.

== Combat chronicle ==
The division began World War I on the Western Front. It saw action in the Battle of the Frontiers and in the Race for the Sea. In January 1915, it was transferred to the Eastern Front, where it remained until December 1917. It fought in the Gorlice-Tarnów Offensive in 1915. After returning to the Western Front, it participated in the 1918 German spring offensive, including the Battle of the Lys. In September 1918, it faced an American/French offensive in the Battle of Saint-Mihiel. The division was rated as third class by Allied intelligence.

== Pre-World War I organization ==
The organization of the 31st Division in 1914, shortly before the outbreak of World War I, was as follows:

- 32. Infanterie-Brigade
  - 8. Rheinisches Infanterie-Regiment Nr. 70
  - 10. Lothringisches Infanterie-Regiment Nr. 174
- 62. Infanterie-Brigade
  - Infanterie-Regiment Markgraf Carl (7. Brandenburgisches) Nr. 60
  - 2. Unter-Elsässisches Infanterie-Regiment Nr. 137
  - Infanterie-Regiment Hessen-Homburg Nr. 166
- 31. Kavallerie-Brigade
  - Westfälisches Dragoner-Regiment Nr. 7
  - Ulanen-Regiment Großherzog Friedrich von Baden (Rheinisches) Nr. 7
- 31. Feldartillerie-Brigade
  - 1. Unter-Elsässisches Feldartillerie-Regiment Nr. 31
  - 2. Unter-Elsässisches Feldartillerie-Regiment Nr. 67
- Landwehr-Inpsektion Saarbrücken

== Order of battle on mobilization ==
On mobilization in August 1914 at the beginning of World War I, most divisional cavalry, including brigade headquarters, was withdrawn to form cavalry divisions or split up among divisions as reconnaissance units. Divisions received engineer companies and other support units from their higher headquarters. The 31st Division was redesignated the 31st Infantry Division. Its initial wartime organization was as follows:

- 32. Infanterie-Brigade
  - 8. Rheinisches Infanterie-Regiment Nr. 70
  - 10. Lothringisches Infanterie-Regiment Nr. 174
- 62. Infanterie-Brigade
  - Infanterie-Regiment Markgraf Carl (7. Brandenburgisches) Nr. 60
  - 2. Unter-Elsässisches Infanterie-Regiment Nr. 137
  - Infanterie-Regiment Hessen-Homburg Nr. 166
- Ulanen-Regiment Großherzog Friedrich von Baden (Rheinisches) Nr. 7
- 31. Feldartillerie-Brigade
  - 1. Unter-Elsässisches Feldartillerie-Regiment Nr. 31
  - 2. Unter-Elsässisches Feldartillerie-Regiment Nr. 67
- 1.Kompanie/2. Rheinisches Pionier-Bataillon Nr. 27

== Late World War I organization ==
Divisions underwent many changes during the war, with regiments moving from division to division, and some being destroyed and rebuilt. During the war, most divisions became triangular - one infantry brigade with three infantry regiments rather than two infantry brigades of two regiments (a "square division"). An artillery commander replaced the artillery brigade headquarters, the cavalry was further reduced, the engineer contingent was increased, and a divisional signals command was created. The 31st Infantry Division's order of battle on January 1, 1918, was as follows:

- 32. Infanterie-Brigade
  - 8. Rheinisches Infanterie-Regiment Nr. 70
  - Infanterie-Regiment Hessen-Homburg Nr. 166
  - 10. Lothringisches Infanterie-Regiment Nr. 174
- 5.Eskadron/Ulanen-Regiment Großherzog Friedrich von Baden (Rheinisches) Nr. 7
- Artillerie-Kommandeur 31:
  - 1. Unter-Elsässisches Feldartillerie-Regiment Nr. 31
  - Fußartillerie-Bataillon Nr. 44 (from June 22, 1918)
- Stab Pionier-Bataillon Nr. 93:
  - 1.Kompanie/2. Rheinisches Pionier-Bataillon Nr. 27
  - 3.Reserve-Kompanie/Pionier-Bataillon Nr. 32
  - Minenwerfer-Kompanie Nr. 31
- Divisions-Nachrichten-Kommandeur 31
