= XVI Corps (German Empire) =

XVI Army Corps XVI. Armee-Korps
- Flag of the Staff of a Generalkommando (1871–1918)
- Active: 1 April 1890–1919
- Country: German Empire
- Type: Corps
- Size: Approximately 44,000 (on mobilisation in 1914)
- Garrison/HQ: Metz/Palais du Gouverneur
- Shoulder strap piping: Yellow
- Engagements: World War I Battle of the Frontiers

Insignia
- Abbreviation: XVI AK

The XVI Army Corps / XVI AK (German: XVI. Armee-Korps) was a corps level command of the German Army before and during World War I.

It was assigned to the VII Army Inspectorate, which became the 5th Army at the start of the First World War. It was still in existence at the end of the war in the 3rd Army, Heeresgruppe Deutscher Kronprinz on the Western Front.

== Formation ==
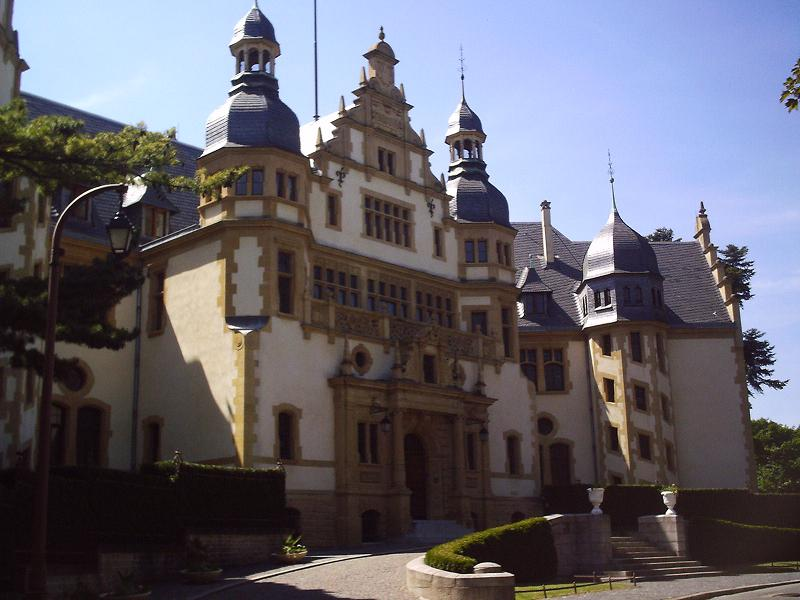
Headquarters, XVI Army Corps

By a law of 27 January 1890, it was decided to separate Alsace-Lorraine provinces in military affairs. It stipulated that from 1 April 1890 the entire power of the Army of the German Empire should be twenty army corps (Guards, I - XVII, I and II Bavarian). The All-highest Cabinet Order (Allerhöchste Kabinettsorder, AKO) of 1 February 1890 authorised the formation of the XVI and XVII Army Corps.

The XVI Army Corps was set up on 1 April 1890 in Metz as the Generalkommando (headquarters) for Lorraine. Its headquarters was in the fortress of Metz. It took command of 33rd Division (formerly 30th Division of XV Corps) and 34th Division formed on the same date. It was assigned to the VII Army Inspectorate but joined the 5th Army at the start of the First World War.

== Peacetime organisation ==
The 25 peacetime Corps of the German Army (Guards, I - XXI, I - III Bavarian) had a reasonably standardised organisation. Each consisted of two divisions with usually two infantry brigades, one field artillery brigade and a cavalry brigade each. Each brigade normally consisted of two regiments of the appropriate type, so each Corps normally commanded 8 infantry, 4 field artillery and 4 cavalry regiments. There were exceptions to this rule:

V, VI, VII, IX and XIV Corps each had a 5th infantry brigade (so 10 infantry regiments)
II, XIII, XVIII and XXI Corps had a 9th infantry regiment
I, VI and XVI Corps had a 3rd cavalry brigade (so 6 cavalry regiments)
the Guards Corps had 11 infantry regiments (in 5 brigades) and 8 cavalry regiments (in 4 brigades).

Each Corps also directly controlled a number of other units. This could include one or more

Foot Artillery Regiment
Jäger Battalion
Pioneer Battalion
Train Battalion

Peacetime organization of the Corps
Corps	Division	Brigade	Units	Garrison
XVI Corps	33rd Division	66th Infantry Brigade	98th (Metz) Infantry	Metz
XVI Corps	33rd Division	66th Infantry Brigade	130th (1st Lotharingian) Infantry	Metz
XVI Corps	33rd Division	67th Infantry Brigade	135th (3rd Lotharingian) Infantry	Diedenhofen
XVI Corps	33rd Division	67th Infantry Brigade	144th (5th Lotharingian) Infantry	Metz
XVI Corps	33rd Division	33rd Field Artillery Brigade	33rd (1st Lotharingian) Field Artillery	Metz
XVI Corps	33rd Division	33rd Field Artillery Brigade	34th (2nd Lotharingian) Field Artillery	Metz
XVI Corps	33rd Division	33rd Cavalry Brigade	9th (1st Hannover) Dragoons "King Charles I of Rumania"	Metz
XVI Corps	33rd Division	33rd Cavalry Brigade	13th (Schleswig-Holstein) Dragoons	Metz
XVI Corps	34th Division	68th Infantry Brigade	67th (4th Magdeburg) Infantry	Metz
XVI Corps	34th Division	68th Infantry Brigade	145th (6th Lotharingian) King's Infantry	Metz
XVI Corps	34th Division	86th Infantry Brigade	30th (4th Rhenish) Infantry "Count Werder"	Saarlouis
XVI Corps	34th Division	86th Infantry Brigade	173rd (9th Lotharingian) Infantry	St. Avold, III Bn at Metz
XVI Corps	34th Division	34th Field Artillery Brigade	69th (3rd Lotharingian) Field Artillery	St. Avold
XVI Corps	34th Division	34th Field Artillery Brigade	70th (4th Lotharingian) Field Artillery	Metz, Saarlouis
XVI Corps	34th Division	34th Cavalry Brigade	14th (2nd Hannover) Uhlans	St. Avold, Mörchingen
XVI Corps	34th Division	34th Cavalry Brigade	12th Jäger zu Pferde	St. Avold
XVI Corps	34th Division	45th Cavalry Brigade	13th (1st Kurhessian) Hussars "King Umberto of Italy"	Diedenhofen
XVI Corps	34th Division	45th Cavalry Brigade	13th Jäger zu Pferde	Saarlouis
XVI Corps	Corps Troops		11th Fortress Machine Gun Abteilung	Diedenhofen
XVI Corps	Corps Troops		12th Fortress Machine Gun Abteilung	Metz
XVI Corps	Corps Troops		13th Fortress Machine Gun Abteilung	Metz
XVI Corps	Corps Troops		14th Fortress Machine Gun Abteilung	Metz
XVI Corps	Corps Troops		15th Fortress Machine Gun Abteilung	Metz
XVI Corps	Corps Troops		8th (Rhenish) Foot Artillery	Metz
XVI Corps	Corps Troops		12th (1st Royal Saxon) Foot Artillery	Metz
XVI Corps	Corps Troops		16th (Lotharingian) Foot Artillery	Metz, Diedenhofen
XVI Corps	Corps Troops		16th (1st Lotharingian) Pioneer Battalion	Metz
XVI Corps	Corps Troops		20th (2nd Lotharingian) (Fortress-) Pioneer Battalion	Metz
XVI Corps	Corps Troops		3rd (Fortress-) Telephone Company	Metz
XVI Corps	Corps Troops		16th (Lotharingian) Train Battalion	Saarlouis
XVI Corps	Metz Defence Command (Landwehr-Inspektion)			Metz

== World War I ==
=== Organisation on mobilisation ===
On mobilization on 2 August 1914 the Corps was restructured. 33rd and 45th Cavalry Brigades were withdrawn to form part of the 6th Cavalry Division and the 34th Cavalry Brigade was broken up and its regiments assigned to the divisions as reconnaissance units. Divisions received engineer companies and other support units from the Corps headquarters. In summary, XVI Corps mobilised with 24 infantry battalions, 8 machine gun companies (48 machine guns), 8 cavalry squadrons, 24 field artillery batteries (144 guns), 4 heavy artillery batteries (16 guns), 3 pioneer companies and an aviation detachment.

Initial wartime organization of the Corps
Corps	Division	Brigade	Units
XVI Corps	33rd Division	66th Infantry Brigade	98th Infantry Regiment
XVI Corps	33rd Division	66th Infantry Brigade	130th Infantry Regiment
XVI Corps	33rd Division	67th Infantry Brigade	135th Infantry Regiment
XVI Corps	33rd Division	67th Infantry Brigade	144th Infantry Regiment
XVI Corps	33rd Division	33rd Field Artillery Brigade	33rd Field Artillery Regiment
XVI Corps	33rd Division	33rd Field Artillery Brigade	34th Field Artillery Regiment
XVI Corps	33rd Division		12th Jäger zu Pferde Regiment
XVI Corps	33rd Division		1st Company, 16th Pioneer Battalion
XVI Corps	33rd Division		33rd Divisional Pontoon Train
XVI Corps	33rd Division		1st Medical Company
XVI Corps	33rd Division		3rd Medical Company
XVI Corps	34th Division	68th Infantry Brigade	67th Infantry Regiment
XVI Corps	34th Division	68th Infantry Brigade	145th King's Infantry Regiment
XVI Corps	34th Division	86th Infantry Brigade	30th Infantry Regiment
XVI Corps	34th Division	86th Infantry Brigade	173rd Infantry Regiment
XVI Corps	34th Division	34th Field Artillery Brigade	69th Field Artillery Regiment
XVI Corps	34th Division	34th Field Artillery Brigade	70th Field Artillery Regiment
XVI Corps	34th Division		14th Uhlan Regiment
XVI Corps	34th Division		2nd Company, 16th Pioneer Battalion
XVI Corps	34th Division		3rd Company, 16th Pioneer Battalion
XVI Corps	34th Division		34th Divisional Pontoon Train
XVI Corps	34th Division		2nd Medical Company
XVI Corps	Corps Troops		I Battalion, 10th Foot Artillery Regiment
XVI Corps	Corps Troops		2nd Aviation Detachment
XVI Corps	Corps Troops		16th Corps Pontoon Train
XVI Corps	Corps Troops		16th Telephone Detachment
XVI Corps	Corps Troops		16th Pioneer Searchlight Section
XVI Corps	Corps Troops		Munition Trains and Columns corresponding to II Corps

=== Combat chronicle ===
At the outbreak of World War I, the Corps was assigned to the 5th Army. It fought on the Western Front in Lorraine. It was still in existence at the end of the war in the 3rd Army, Heeresgruppe Deutscher Kronprinz on the Western Front.

== Commanders ==
The XVI Corps had the following commanders during its existence:

Dates	Rank	Name
24 March 1890 to 17 May 1903	General der Kavallerie	Gottlieb Graf von Haeseler
18 May 1903 to 23 April 1906	General der Infanterie	Louis Stoetzer
24 April 1906 to 28 February 1913	General der Infanterie	Maximilian von Prittwitz und Gaffron
1 March 1913 to 28 October 1916	General der Infanterie	Bruno von Mudra
29 October 1916 to end of the war	Generalleutnant	Adolf Wild von Hohenborn

== See also ==
- German Army order of battle (1914)
- German Army order of battle, Western Front (1918)
- List of Imperial German infantry regiments
- List of Imperial German artillery regiments
- List of Imperial German cavalry regiments

== Bibliography ==
- Cron, Hermann (2002) [1937]. Imperial German Army 1914–18: Organisation, Structure, Orders-of-Battle. Helion & Co. ISBN 1-874622-70-1.
- Ellis, John; Cox, Michael (1993). The World War I Databook. Aurum Press Ltd. ISBN 1-85410-766-6.
- Haythornthwaite, Philip J. (1996). The World War One Source Book. Arms and Armour. ISBN 1-85409-351-7.
- The German Forces in the Field; 7th Revision, 11th November 1918; Compiled by the General Staff, War Office. Imperial War Museum, London and the Battery Press. 1995 [1918]. ISBN 978-1-870423-95-3.
