= Edward Warner (VC) =

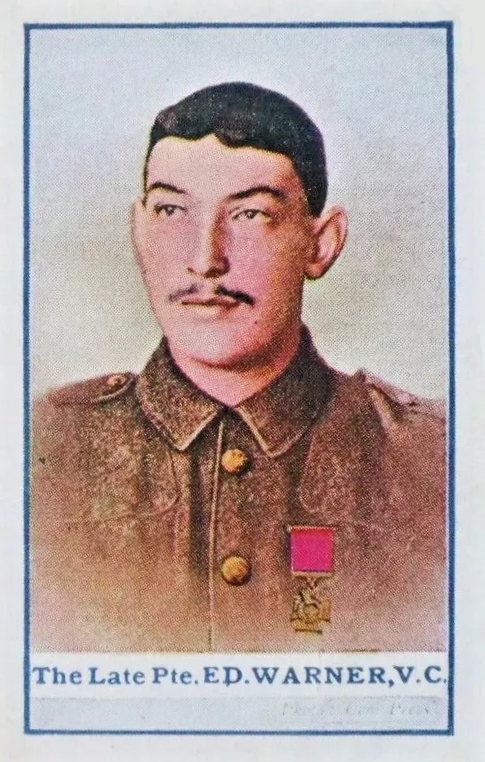
- Warner on a cigarette card
- Born: 18 November 1883; St Albans, Hertfordshire, England
- Died: 2 May 1915 (aged 31); Hill 60, Ypres salient, Belgium
- Burial place: Remembered on the Menin Gate Memorial
- Military career
- Allegiance: United Kingdom
- Branch: British Army
- Service years: 1903–1915 †
- Service number: 7602
- Units: Bedfordshire Regiment
- Conflicts: World War I: Western Front (WIA); Battle of Mons; Retreat from Mons; Battle of Le Cateau; First Battle of the Marne; First Battle of the Aisne; First Battle of Ypres; Battle of Hill 60 (DOW)
- Awards: Victoria Cross

Private Edward Warner VC (18 November 1883 – 2 May 1915) was an English recipient of the Victoria Cross, the highest and most prestigious award for gallantry in the face of the enemy that can be awarded to British and Commonwealth forces. He was a private in the 1st Battalion, The Bedfordshire Regiment, British Army during World War I, who was posthumously awarded the Victoria Cross for gallantry during the defence of Hill 60 on 1 May 1915.

== Before World War I ==
Born and raised in St Albans, Warner worked as a straw hat finisher before enlisting in the Bedfordshire Regiment in late 1903 as Private 7602. Service in India followed, the battalion returning to England in 1908 at the end of its tour of foreign service. His term in the regulars complete, Warner became a reservist and worked at the Deep Well Boring Works, for the St. Albans council and the Post Office Telephones Dept.

== War service ==
When war was declared in August 1914, Private Warner was mobilised and rejoined the 1st Battalion who were based in Ireland. He arrived on the Western Front with the battalion on 16 August 1914 and fought in the Battle of Mons, the Battle of Le Cateau, during the rearguard actions of the British Army's Retreat from Mons, at the First Battle of the Marne, the First Battle of the Aisne, the Battle of La Bassée and the First Battle of Ypres. Despite the high casualties his battalion sustained in these early battles, Warner came through with just a poisoned hand.

After the winter's lull in fighting and Warner's battalion's involvement in the Christmas truce of 1914, the campaigning season restarted and he found himself in the line around Hill 60, south-east of Ypres. He 'had been due to complete his service in May 1915 but with dependants, 75-year-old widowed mother Charlotte and new fiancée Maud Burton, waiting at home, was doubtless contemplating whether to extend his service or take the well-earned, honourable discharge that would be offered to him in the coming weeks. Having come through the dreadful battle on Hill 60 in April, he had written to his mother days earlier; "You will see in the papers that we have been in a tight corner. I think it’s the hottest place I have ever been in but, thank the Lord, I have been spared to get through alright. We have lost a lot killed and wounded. It was a proper death trap. The dirty pigs could not have blown us to pieces fast enough so they tried to blind us but I am pleased to say I am safe."'

=== Victoria Cross ===
Following almost two weeks of fierce fighting for control of 'Murder Hill', Warner and his battalion were due for relief once darkness arrived on 1 May 1915, but at 6.30 p.m. that evening, a German gas attack was launched against the defenders of the hill. On the right, the 1st Battalion, Devonshire Regiment lost over 300 men in just moments, leaving the 1st Battalion, Bedfordshire Regiment on their left flank exposed.

Warner's platoon held the right flank of the battalion line on the hill, every one of his colleagues being taken by the effects of gas as it rolled into their section. Regardless of the overwhelming numbers arrayed against him, the psychological effects of a new weapon such as gas, with no real defence against its effects and being under heavy shell fire, Warner remained in the trench, fending off all German attempts to gain entry. Once a lull in the fighting allowed, he moved back through the gas cloud, artillery bombardment and machine gun fire to gather reinforcements. Warner found some men from his battalion and guided them back into the danger area but soon after returning to the front trenches, he had to be carried back to the regimental aid post suffering from the effects of prolonged exposure to the gas.

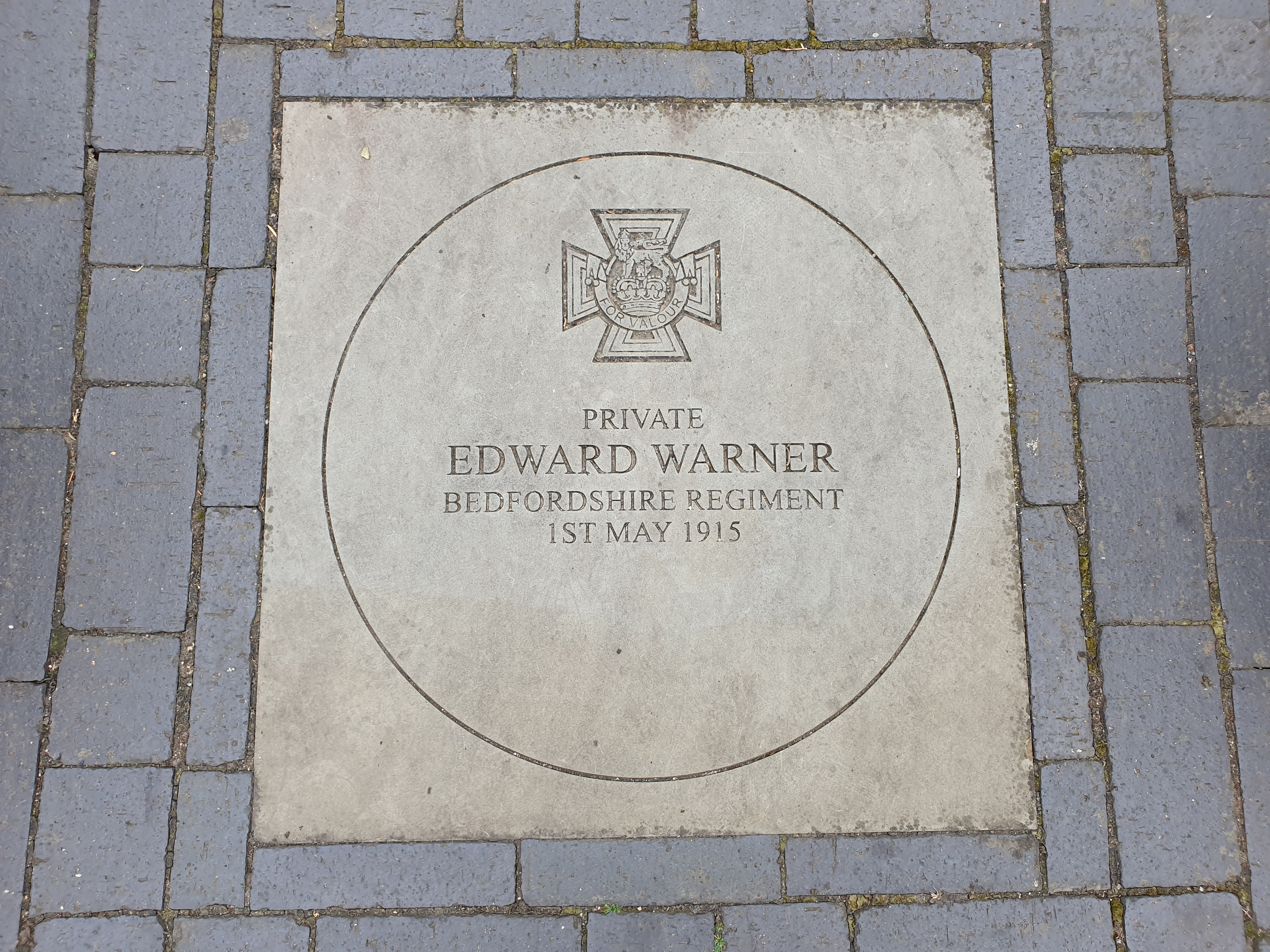
Edward Warner (VC) memorial at St. Albans War Memorial

'The night quietened down and on the morning of 2 May Fred Brimm found his mortally wounded friend, Ted Warner, 'more dead than alive' at the nearby Regimental Aid Post. He wrote: 'Ted was quite sensible to within half an hour of his death. He knew he was going and only wanted another chance to get at them again. His last words were "They’ve gone and done for me, the cowards."’

As is often the case with the earlier war deaths from around Ypres, Warner's grave was lost in the fighting that continued to rage in the salient for a further 42 months and he is remembered on the Ypres (Menin Gate) Memorial to the missing. An image survives of his original grave marker, taken from the Mudlark, magazine of the 1st Bedfordshire Regiment.

The London Gazette (29 June 1915) published the citation which accompanied the posthumous award of Edward Warner's Victoria Cross, reading:

No. 7602 Private Edward Warner, 1st Battalion, The Bedfordshire Regiment.

For most conspicuous bravery near ' Hill 60 ' on 1st May, 1915. After Trench 46 had been vacated by our troops, consequent on a gas attack, Private Warner entered it single-handed in order to prevent the enemy taking possession. Reinforcements were sent to Private Warner, but could not reach him owing to the gas. He then came back and brought up more men, by which time he was completely exhausted, but the trench was held until the enemy's attack ceased.

This very gallant soldier died shortly afterwards from the effects of gas poisoning.

== The medal ==
His Victoria Cross, along with his 1914 Star, Victory and British War Medals are displayed at the Bedfordshire and Hertfordshire Regimental Museum, Wardown Park, Luton, Bedfordshire, England.

== Bibliography ==
- Monuments to Courage (David Harvey, 1999)
- The Register of the Victoria Cross (This England, 1997)
- Batchelor, Peter; Matson, Christopher (2011). The Western Front 1915. VCs of the First World War. Stroud, Gloucestershire: The History Press. ISBN 978-0-7524-6057-4.
