= Edward Dwyer =

Recipient of the Victoria Cross

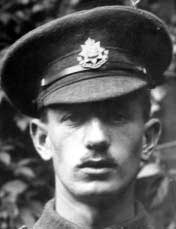
- Dwyer in 1914
- Born: 25 November 1895; Fulham, London, England
- Died: 3 September 1916 (aged 20); Guillemont, France
- Burial place: Flatiron Copse Cemetery, Mametz
- Military career
- Allegiance: United Kingdom
- Branch: British Army
- Service years: 1912–1916
- Rank: Corporal
- Service number: 10523
- Units: East Surrey Regiment
- Conflicts: First World War; Western Front; Second Battle of Ypres; Battle of the Somme
- Awards: Victoria Cross; Cross of St. George (Russia)

Corporal Edward Dwyer, VC (25 November 1895 – 3 September 1916) was a British Army soldier and an English recipient of the Victoria Cross (VC), the highest award for gallantry in the face of the enemy that can be awarded to British and Commonwealth forces.

== Early life ==
Dwyer was born in Fulham, London, on 25 November 1895. His forename, as it appears on the birth index, 1901 and 1911 censuses is Edwin. In 1901 the family lived at 40 Walham Avenue, Fulham, close to Darlan Road, off Fulham Road. At the time of the 1911 census, he was employed as a Grocer's shop assistant.

On 2 July 1912 he enlisted under Special Reserve terms of service of six years, to complete six months of mandatory training, then to transfer to the Reserves, albeit on call until 1 July 1918. He was released from this contractual obligation, in order to enlist as a regular. On 6 September 1912, he enlisted under Regular terms of service of 12 years. His declared age upon enlistment suggested he was born on 25 August 1894, and over 18. The daily rate of pay for a Boy was 8d, versus 12d for a Private in a line infantry regiment aged 18 years and over.

== First World War ==
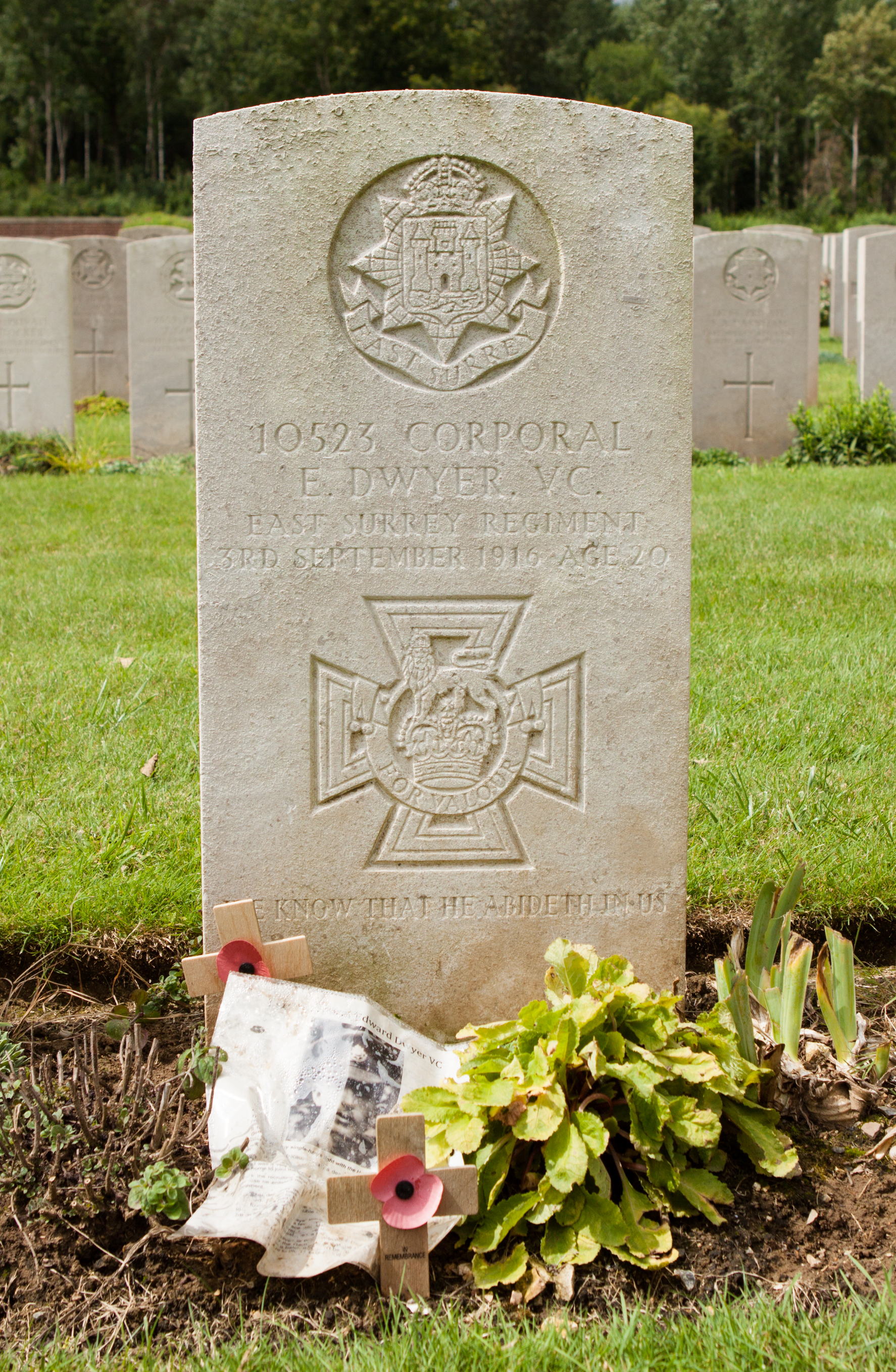
Dwyer's gravestone at the Flatiron Copse Cemetery

On 16 August 1914, the 1st Battalion disembarked at Le Havre, Dwyer was present.

Dwyer was 19 years old, and a private in the 1st Battalion, East Surrey Regiment, British Army during the First World War, when he was awarded the VC for his actions on 20 April 1915 at Hill 60 in Belgium.

For most conspicuous bravery and devotion to duty at "Hill 60" on the 20th April, 1915. When his trench was heavily attacked by German grenade throwers he climbed on to the parapet, and, although subjected to a hail of bombs at close quarters, succeeded in dispersing the enemy by the effective use of his hand grenades. Private Dwyer displayed great gallantry earlier on this day in leaving his trench, under heavy shell fire, to bandage his wounded comrades.

Dwyer was also awarded the Cross of St. George (Russia) decoration. He was later promoted to the rank of corporal. He was killed in action at Guillemont, France on 3 September 1916. His grave is located at Flatiron Copse Military Cemetery, France, which is 4 miles east of Albert (Plot III, Row J, Grave 3). His brother Charles died in Salonika in 1917.

His VC is displayed at the Princess of Wales's Royal Regiment (Queens and Royal Hampshires) Museum located in Dover Castle, Kent.

== Recording ==
In 1916, Dwyer made an audio recording for the Regal record label in which he described taking part in the Retreat from Mons in the early days of the war. The monologue describes life at the front, pay and rations, and includes a sample of one of the songs sung by soldiers at the time. Both sides of the Regal disc (each lasting about 3 minutes) made for the British enlistment services are available on the archive audio collections Oh! It's a Lovely War (Vol 1) and Artists Rifles on CD41, which along with the Dwyer sides includes popular and patriotic songs, marches and descriptive sketch records. Dwyer's recording appears to be the only one made by a serving British soldier during the Great War, and as such is unique. Part of the recording was used in the 2003 documentary The First World War.
