= 42nd Division (German Empire) =

42nd Division (42. Division); from August 2, 1914, 42nd Infantry Division (42. Infanterie-Division)
- Active: 1912–19
- Country: Prussia, German Empire
- Branch: Army
- Type: Infantry (in peacetime included cavalry)
- Size: Approx. 15,000
- Part of: XXI. Army Corps (XXI. Armeekorps)
- Garrison/HQ: Saarburg
- Engagements: World War I: Battle of the Frontiers; Race to the Sea; Second Battle of the Masurian Lakes; Gorlice–Tarnów Offensive; Hundred Days Offensive

The 42nd Division (42. Division) was a unit of the Prussian/German Army. It was formed on October 1, 1912, and was the last regular division created in the Imperial German Army. It was headquartered in Saarburg in Lothringen (now Sarrebourg, France). The division was subordinated in peacetime to the XXI Army Corps (XXI. Armeekorps). The division was disbanded in 1919 during the demobilization of the German Army after World War I. The division was primarily recruited in the Rhine Province and the Province of Westphalia, as the German population in Alsace-Lorraine was insufficient to fill the division.

== Combat chronicle ==
The division began World War I on the Western Front, fighting in the Battle of the Frontiers and then in the Race to the Sea. It was then transferred to the Eastern Front, seeing action in 1915 in the Second Battle of the Masurian Lakes, Gorlice-Tarnów Offensive and Operation Albion. It remained on the Eastern Front until December 1917, when it returned to France. In 1918, it fought in the Battle of the Lys and faced various Allied offensives, including the Hundred Days Offensive. Allied intelligence rated the division as third class.

== Pre-World War I organization ==
The organization of the 42nd Division in 1914, shortly before the outbreak of World War I, was as follows:

- 59. Infanterie-Brigade
  - 1. Oberrheinisches Infanterie-Regiment Nr. 97
  - 3. Unter-Elsässisches Infanterie-Regiment Nr. 138
- 65. Infanterie-Brigade
  - Infanterie-Regiment Graf Barfuß (4. Westfälisches) Nr. 17
  - 2. Lothringisches Infanterie-Regiment Nr. 131
- 42. Kavallerie-Brigade
  - Ulanen-Regiment Graf Haeseler (2. Brandenburgisches) Nr. 11
  - Schleswig-Holsteinisches Ulanen-Regiment Nr. 15
- 42. Feldartillerie-Brigade
  - Feldartillerie-Regiment von Holtzendorff (1. Rheinisches) Nr. 8
  - 1. Ober-Elsässiches Feldartillerie-Regiment Nr. 15

== Order of battle on mobilization ==
On mobilization in August 1914 at the beginning of World War I, most divisional cavalry, including brigade headquarters, was withdrawn to form cavalry divisions or split up among divisions as reconnaissance units. Divisions received engineer companies and other support units from their higher headquarters. The 42nd Division was redesignated the 42nd Infantry Division. Its initial wartime organization was as follows:

- 59. Infanterie-Brigade
  - 1. Oberrheinisches Infanterie-Regiment Nr. 97
  - 3. Unter-Elsässisches Infanterie-Regiment Nr. 138
- 65. Infanterie-Brigade
  - Infanterie-Regiment Graf Barfuß (4. Westfälisches) Nr. 17
  - 2. Lothringisches Infanterie-Regiment Nr. 131
- Westfälisches Dragoner-Regiment Nr. 7
- 42. Feldartillerie-Brigade
  - Feldartillerie-Regiment von Holtzendorff (1. Rheinisches) Nr. 8
  - 1. Ober-Elsässiches Feldartillerie-Regiment Nr. 15
- 2.Kompanie/2. Rheinisches Pionier-Bataillon Nr. 27
- 3.Kompanie/Sturmtruppen Pionier

== Late World War I organization ==
Divisions underwent many changes during the war, with regiments moving from division to division, and some being destroyed and rebuilt. During the war, most divisions became triangular - one infantry brigade with three infantry regiments rather than two infantry brigades of two regiments (a "square division"). An artillery commander replaced the artillery brigade headquarters, the cavalry was further reduced, the engineer contingent was increased, and a divisional signals command was created. The 42nd Infantry Division's order of battle on January 1, 1918, was as follows:

- 65. Infanterie-Brigade
  - Infanterie-Regiment Graf Barfuß (4. Westfälisches) Nr. 17
  - 2. Lothringisches Infanterie-Regiment Nr. 131
  - 3. Unter-Elsässisches Infanterie-Regiment Nr. 138
- 1. Eskadron/Westfälisches Dragoner-Regiment Nr. 7
- Artillerie-Kommandeur 42
  - 1. Ober-Elsässiches Feldartillerie-Regiment Nr. 15
  - III. Bataillon/2. Pommersches Fußartillerie-Regiment Nr. 15 (from April 5, 1918)
- Stab Pionier-Bataillon Nr. 27
  - 3.Kompanie/2. Rheinisches Pionier-Bataillon Nr. 27
  - 5.Kompanie/2. Rheinisches Pionier-Bataillon Nr. 27
  - Minenwerfer-Kompanie Nr. 42
- Divisions-Nachrichten-Kommandeur 42
