= 33rd Division (German Empire) =

33rd Division (33. Division); from August 2, 1914, 33rd Infantry Division (33. Infanterie-Division)
- Active: 1871-1919
- Country: Prussia/Germany
- Branch: Army
- Type: Infantry (in peacetime included cavalry)
- Size: Approx. 15,000
- Part of: XVI. Army Corps (XVI. Armeekorps)
- Garrison/HQ: Metz
- Engagements: World War I: Great Retreat, Verdun, 2nd Aisne, German spring offensive, St. Quentin, Champagne-Marne, Meuse-Argonne Offensive

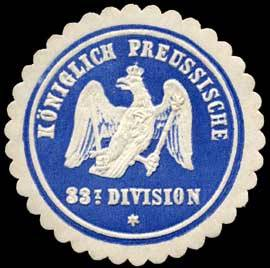
Royal Prussian 33rd Division Seal

The 33rd Division (33. Division) was a unit of the Prussian/German Army. It was formed on April 1, 1871, as the 30th Division and became the 33rd Division on April 1, 1890, and was headquartered in Metz (now in France). The division was subordinated in peacetime to the XVI Army Corps (XVI. Armeekorps). The division was disbanded in 1919 during the demobilization of the German Army after World War I. The division was recruited heavily in densely populated Westphalia, as its primary recruiting and garrison area was Lorraine, whose German population was insufficient to support the division.

== Combat chronicle ==
The division fought on the Western Front in World War I. It participated in the initial German offensive and the Allied Great Retreat. In 1916, it fought in the Battle of Verdun. In 1917, it participated in the Second Battle of the Aisne, also known as the Third Battle of Champagne (and to the Germans, as the Double Battle of Aisne-Champagne). In 1918, the division fought in the German spring offensive, including the First Battle of the Somme, 1918, also known as the Second Battle of the Somme (after the 1916 battle), and the Battle of St. Quentin. It then fought in the subsequent Allied counteroffensives, including the Battle of Champagne-Marne and the Meuse-Argonne Offensive. Allied intelligence rated the division as first class and the XVI Army Corps as one of the best in the German Army.

== Pre-World War I organization ==
The organization of the 33rd Division in 1914, shortly before the outbreak of World War I, was as follows:

- 66. Infanterie-Brigade
  - Metzer Infanterie-Regiment Nr. 98
  - 1. Lothringisches Infanterie-Regiment Nr. 130
- 67. Infanterie-Brigade
  - 3. Lothringisches Infanterie-Regiment Nr. 135
  - 5. Lothringisches Infanterie-Regiment Nr. 144
- 33. Kavallerie-Brigade
  - Dragoner-Regiment König Karl von Rümanien (1. Hannoversches) Nr. 9
  - Schleswig-Holsteinisches Dragoner-Regiment Nr. 13
- 33. Feldartillerie-Brigade
  - 1. Lothringisches Feldartillerie-Regiment Nr. 33
  - 2. Lothringisches Feldartillerie-Regiment Nr. 34
- Landwehr-Inspektion Metz

== Order of battle on mobilization ==
On mobilization in August 1914 at the beginning of World War I, most divisional cavalry, including brigade headquarters, was withdrawn to form cavalry divisions or split up among divisions as reconnaissance units. Divisions received engineer companies and other support units from their higher headquarters. The 33rd Division was redesignated the 33rd Infantry Division. Its initial wartime organization was as follows:

- 66. Infanterie-Brigade
  - Metzer Infanterie-Regiment Nr. 98
  - 1. Lothringisches Infanterie-Regiment Nr. 130
- 67. Infanterie-Brigade
  - 3. Lothringisches Infanterie-Regiment Nr. 135
  - 5. Lothringisches Infanterie-Regiment Nr. 144
- Jäger-Regiment zu Pferde Nr. 12
- 33. Feldartillerie-Brigade
  - 1. Lothringisches Feldartillerie-Regiment Nr. 33
  - 2. Lothringisches Feldartillerie-Regiment Nr. 34
- 1.Kompanie/1. Lothringisches Pionier-Bataillon Nr. 16

== Late World War I organization ==
Divisions underwent many changes during the war, with regiments moving from division to division, and some being destroyed and rebuilt. During the war, most divisions became triangular - one infantry brigade with three infantry regiments rather than two infantry brigades of two regiments (a "square division"). An artillery commander replaced the artillery brigade headquarters, the cavalry was further reduced, the engineer contingent was increased, and a divisional signals command was created. The 33rd Infantry Division's order of battle on March 10, 1918, was as follows:

- 66. Infanterie-Brigade
  - Metzer Infanterie-Regiment Nr. 98
  - 1. Lothringisches Infanterie-Regiment Nr. 130
  - 3. Lothringisches Infanterie-Regiment Nr. 135
  - Maschinengewehr-Scharfschützen-Abteilung Nr. 43
- 4.Eskadron/Jäger-Regiment zu Pferde Nr. 12
- Artillerie-Kommandeur 33:
  - Feldartillerie-Regiment Nr. 283
  - Fußartillerie-Bataillon Nr. 76
- Stab 1. Lothringisches Pionier-Bataillon Nr. 16:
  - 5.Kompanie/1. Lothringisches Pionier-Bataillon Nr. 16
  - 1.Reserve-Kompanie/1. Lothringisches Pionier-Bataillon Nr. 16
  - Minenwerfer-Kompanie Nr. 33
- Divisions-Nachrichten-Kommandeur 33
