= XXI Corps (German Empire) =

XXI Army Corps XXI. Armee-Korps
- Flag of the Staff of a Generalkommando (1871–1918)
- Active: 1 October 1912–1919
- Country: German Empire
- Branch: Army
- Type: Corps
- Size: Approximately 44,000 (on mobilisation in 1914)
- Garrison/HQ: Saarbrücken/Landgericht, Hindenburgstraße
- Shoulder strap piping: Light Green
- Engagements: World War I: Battle of the Frontiers

Insignia
- Abbreviation: XXI AK

The XXI Army Corps / XXI AK (German: XXI. Armee-Korps) was a corps level command of the German Army, before and during World War I.

As the German Army expanded in the latter part of the 19th century and early part of the 20th century, the XXI Army Corps was set up on 1 October 1912 in Saarbrücken as the Generalkommando (headquarters) for the districts of Koblenz, Trier and part of Alsace–Lorraine. It took over command of 31st Division from XV Corps and the newly formed 42nd Division (the last division to be formed by the peacetime army). General der Infanterie Fritz von Below, former commander of 1st Guards Division, took command.

It was assigned to the VII Army Inspectorate. but joined the predominantly Bavarian 6th Army at the start of the First World War. It was still in existence at the end of the war in the 5th Army, Heeresgruppe Gallwitz on the Western Front.

== Peacetime organisation ==
The 25 peacetime Corps of the German Army (Guards, I–XXI, I–III Bavarian) had a reasonably standardised organisation. Each consisted of two divisions with usually two infantry brigades, one field artillery brigade and a cavalry brigade each. Each brigade normally consisted of two regiments of the appropriate type, so each Corps normally commanded 8 infantry, 4 field artillery and 4 cavalry regiments. There were exceptions to this rule:

V, VI, VII, IX and XIV Corps each had a 5th infantry brigade (so 10 infantry regiments)
II, XIII, XVIII and XXI had a 9th infantry regiment
I, VI and XVI Corps had a 3rd cavalry brigade (so 6 cavalry regiments)
the Guards Corps had 11 infantry regiments (in 5 brigades) and 8 cavalry regiments (in 4 brigades).

Each Corps also directly controlled a number of other units. This could include one or more

Foot Artillery Regiment
Jäger Battalion
Pioneer Battalion
Train Battalion

Peacetime organization of the Corps
Corps	Division	Brigade	Units	Garrison
XXI Corps	31st Division	32nd Infantry Brigade	70th (8th Rhenish) Infantry	Saarbrücken
XXI Corps	31st Division	32nd Infantry Brigade	174th (10th Lotharingian) Infantry	Forbach
XXI Corps	31st Division	62nd Infantry Brigade	60th (7th Brandenburg) Infantry "Margrave Charles"	Weißenburg
XXI Corps	31st Division	62nd Infantry Brigade	137th (2nd Lower Alsatian) Infantry	Hagenau
XXI Corps	31st Division	62nd Infantry Brigade	166th (Hessen-Homburg) Infantry	Bitsch
XXI Corps	31st Division	31st Field Artillery Brigade	31st (1st Lower Alsatian) Field Artillery	Hagenau
XXI Corps	31st Division	31st Field Artillery Brigade	67th (2nd Lower Alsatian) Field Artillery	Hagenau, Bischweiler
XXI Corps	31st Division	31st Cavalry Brigade	7th (Westphalian) Dragoons	Saarbrücken
XXI Corps	31st Division	31st Cavalry Brigade	7th (Rhenish) Uhlans "Archduke Frederick of Baden"	Saarbrücken
XXI Corps	42nd Division	59th Infantry Brigade	97th (1st Upper Rhenish) Infantry	Saarburg
XXI Corps	42nd Division	59th Infantry Brigade	138th (3rd Lower Alsatian) Infantry	Dieuze
XXI Corps	42nd Division	65th Infantry Brigade	17th (4th Westphalian) Infantry "Count Barfuss"	Mörchingen
XXI Corps	42nd Division	65th Infantry Brigade	131st (2nd Lotharingian) Infantry	Mörchingen
XXI Corps	42nd Division	42nd Field Artillery Brigade	8th (1st Rhenish) Field Artillery "von Holtzendorff"	Saarbrücken
XXI Corps	42nd Division	42nd Field Artillery Brigade	15th (1st Upper Alsatian) Field Artillery	Saarburg, Mörchingen
XXI Corps	42nd Division	42nd Cavalry Brigade	11th (2nd Brandenburg) Uhlans "Count Haeseler"	Saarburg
XXI Corps	42nd Division	42nd Cavalry Brigade	15th (Schleswig-Holstein) Uhlans	Saarburg
XXI Corps	Corps Troops		3rd Machine Gun Abteilung	Saarburg
XXI Corps	Corps Troops		27th (2nd Rhenish) Pioneer Battalion	Trier
XXI Corps	Corps Troops		21st (2nd Rhenish) Train Battalion	Forbach
XXI Corps	Saarbrücken Defence Command (Landwehr-Inspektion)			Saarbrücken

== World War I ==
=== Organisation on mobilisation ===
On mobilization on 2 August 1914 the Corps was restructured. 42nd Cavalry Brigade was withdrawn to form part of the 7th Cavalry Division and the 31st Cavalry Brigade was broken up and its regiments assigned to the divisions as reconnaissance units. Divisions received engineer companies and other support units from the Corps headquarters. Unusually, the Corps retained its 9th infantry regiment on mobilisation. In summary, XXI Corps mobilised with 27 infantry battalions, 9 machine gun companies (54 machine guns), 8 cavalry squadrons, 24 field artillery batteries (144 guns), 4 heavy artillery batteries (16 guns), 3 pioneer companies, and an aviation detachment.

Initial wartime organization of the Corps
Corps	Division	Brigade	Units
XXI Corps	31st Division	32nd Infantry Brigade	70th Infantry Regiment
XXI Corps	31st Division	32nd Infantry Brigade	174th Infantry Regiment
XXI Corps	31st Division	62nd Infantry Brigade	60th Infantry Regiment
XXI Corps	31st Division	62nd Infantry Brigade	137th Infantry Regiment
XXI Corps	31st Division	62nd Infantry Brigade	166th Infantry Regiment
XXI Corps	31st Division	31st Field Artillery Brigade	31st Field Artillery Regiment
XXI Corps	31st Division	31st Field Artillery Brigade	67th Field Artillery Regiment
XXI Corps	31st Division		7th Uhlan Regiment
XXI Corps	31st Division		1st Company, 27th Pioneer Battalion
XXI Corps	31st Division		31st Divisional Pontoon Train
XXI Corps	31st Division		1st Medical Company
XXI Corps	42nd Division	59th Infantry Brigade	97th Infantry Regiment
XXI Corps	42nd Division	59th Infantry Brigade	138th Infantry Regiment
XXI Corps	42nd Division	65th Infantry Brigade	17th Infantry Regiment
XXI Corps	42nd Division	65th Infantry Brigade	131st Infantry Regiment
XXI Corps	42nd Division	42nd Field Artillery Brigade	8th Field Artillery Regiment
XXI Corps	42nd Division	42nd Field Artillery Brigade	15th Field Artillery Regiment
XXI Corps	42nd Division		7th Dragoon Regiment
XXI Corps	42nd Division		2nd Company, 27th Pioneer Battalion
XXI Corps	42nd Division		3rd Company, 27th Pioneer Battalion
XXI Corps	42nd Division		42nd Divisional Pontoon Train
XXI Corps	42nd Division		2nd Medical Company
XXI Corps	42nd Division		3rd Medical Company
XXI Corps	Corps Troops		II Battalion, 3rd Foot Artillery Regiment
XXI Corps	Corps Troops		8th Aviation Detachment
XXI Corps	Corps Troops		21st Corps Pontoon Train
XXI Corps	Corps Troops		21st Telephone Detachment
XXI Corps	Corps Troops		27th Pioneer Searchlight Section
XXI Corps	Corps Troops		Munition Trains and Columns corresponding to II Corps

=== Combat chronicle ===
On mobilisation, XXI Corps was assigned to the predominantly Bavarian 6th Army forming part of the left wing of the forces for the Schlieffen Plan offensive in August 1914 on the Western Front. By 1915 it was on the Eastern Front where it took part in the siege of Kaunas and the battles on the Neman River and at Vilnius. It was still in existence at the end of the war in the 5th Army, Heeresgruppe Gallwitz on the Western Front.

== Commanders ==
The XXI Corps had the following commanders during its existence:

Dates	Rank	Name
1 October 1912 to 4 April 1915	General der Infanterie	Fritz von Below
4 April 1915 to 2 January 1917	Generalleutnant	Oskar von Hutier
2 January 1917 to end of war	Generalleutnant	Ernst von Oven

== See also ==
- German Army order of battle (1914)
- German Army order of battle, Western Front (1918)
- List of Imperial German infantry regiments
- List of Imperial German artillery regiments
- List of Imperial German cavalry regiments

== Bibliography ==
- Cron, Hermann (2002). Imperial German Army 1914-18: Organisation, Structure, Orders-of-Battle [first published: 1937]. Helion & Co. ISBN 1-874622-70-1.
- Ellis, John; Cox, Michael (1993). The World War I Databook. Aurum Press Ltd. ISBN 1-85410-766-6.
- Haythornthwaite, Philip J. (1996). The World War One Source Book. Arms and Armour. ISBN 1-85409-351-7.
- Histories of Two Hundred and Fifty-One Divisions of the German Army which Participated in the War (1914-1918), compiled from records of Intelligence section of the General Staff, American Expeditionary Forces, at General Headquarters, Chaumont, France 1919. The London Stamp Exchange Ltd. 1989 [1920]. ISBN 0-948130-87-3.
- The German Forces in the Field; 7th Revision, 11th November 1918; Compiled by the General Staff, War Office. Imperial War Museum, London and the Battery Press. 1995 [1918]. ISBN 978-1-870423-95-3.
