= 34th Division (German Empire) =

34th Division (34. Division); from August 2, 1914, 34th Infantry Division (34. Infanterie-Division)
- Active: 1890–1919
- Country: Prussia/Germany
- Branch: Army
- Type: Infantry (in peacetime included cavalry)
- Size: Approx. 15,000
- Part of: XVI. Army Corps (XVI. Armeekorps)
- Garrison/HQ: Metz
- Engagements: World War I: Great Retreat, Verdun, 2nd Aisne, Cambrai, German spring offensive, St. Quentin, Oise-Aisne

The 34th Division (34. Division) was a unit of the Prussian/German Army. It was formed on April 1, 1890, and was headquartered in Metz (now in France). The division was subordinated in peacetime to the XVI Army Corps (XVI. Armeekorps). The division was disbanded in 1919 during the demobilization of the German Army after World War I. The division was recruited heavily in the densely populated Rhine Province and in the Province of Westphalia, as its primary recruiting and garrison area was Lorraine, whose German population was insufficient to support the divisions of the XVI Army Corps.

== Combat chronicle ==
The 34th Infantry Division fought on the Western Front in World War I. It participated in the initial German offensive and the Allied Great Retreat. In 1916, it fought in the Battle of Verdun. In 1917, it participated in the Second Battle of the Aisne, also known as the Third Battle of Champagne (and to the Germans, as the Double Battle of Aisne-Champagne). It also saw action in the tank battle at Cambrai. In 1918, the division fought in the German spring offensive, including the First Battle of the Somme, 1918, also known as the Second Battle of the Somme (after the 1916 battle), and the Battle of St. Quentin. It then fought in the subsequent Allied counteroffensives, including the Oise-Aisne offensive. Allied intelligence rated the division as a good division, one of the best of the second class divisions, and the XVI Army Corps as one of the best in the German Army.

== Pre–World War I organization ==
The organization of the 34th Division in 1914, shortly before the outbreak of World War I, was as follows:

- 68. Infanterie-Brigade
  - 4. Magdeburgisches Infanterie-Regiment Nr. 67
  - Königs-Infanterie-Regiment (6. Lothringisches) Nr. 145
- 86. Infanterie-Brigade
  - Infanterie-Regiment Graf Werder (4. Rheinisches) Nr. 30
  - 9. Lothringisches Infanterie-Regiment Nr. 173
- 34. Kavallerie-Brigade
  - 2. Hannoversches Ulanen-Regiment Nr. 14
  - Jäger-Regiment zu Pferde Nr. 12
- 45. Kavallerie-Brigade
  - Husaren-Regiment König Humbert von Italien (1. Kurhessisches) Nr.13
  - Jäger-Regiment zu Pferde Nr. 13
- 34. Feldartillerie-Brigade
  - 3. Lothringisches Feldartillerie-Regiment Nr. 69
  - 4. Lothringisches Feldartillerie-Regiment Nr. 70

== Order of battle on mobilization ==
On mobilization in August 1914, at the beginning of World War I, most divisional cavalry, including brigade headquarters, was withdrawn to form cavalry divisions or split up among divisions as reconnaissance units. Divisions received engineer companies and other support units from their higher headquarters. The 34th Division was redesignated the 34th Infantry Division. Its initial wartime organization was as follows:

- 68. Infanterie-Brigade
  - 4. Magdeburgisches Infanterie-Regiment Nr. 67
  - Königs-Infanterie-Regiment (6. Lothringisches) Nr. 145
- 86. Infanterie-Brigade
  - Infanterie-Regiment Graf Werder (4. Rheinisches) Nr. 30
  - 9. Lothringisches Infanterie-Regiment Nr. 173
- 2. Hannoversches Ulanen-Regiment Nr. 14
- 34. Feldartillerie-Brigade
  - 3. Lothringisches Feldartillerie-Regiment Nr. 69
  - 4. Lothringisches Feldartillerie-Regiment Nr. 70
- 2.Kompanie/1. Lothringisches Pionier-Bataillon Nr. 16
- 3.Kompanie/1. Lothringisches Pionier-Bataillon Nr. 16

== Late World War I organization ==
Divisions underwent many changes during the war, with regiments moving from division to division, and some being destroyed and rebuilt. During the war, most divisions became triangular - one infantry brigade with three infantry regiments rather than two infantry brigades of two regiments (a "square division"). An artillery commander replaced the artillery brigade headquarters, the cavalry was further reduced, the engineer contingent was increased, and a divisional signals command was created. The 34th Infantry Division's order of battle on March 12, 1918, was as follows:

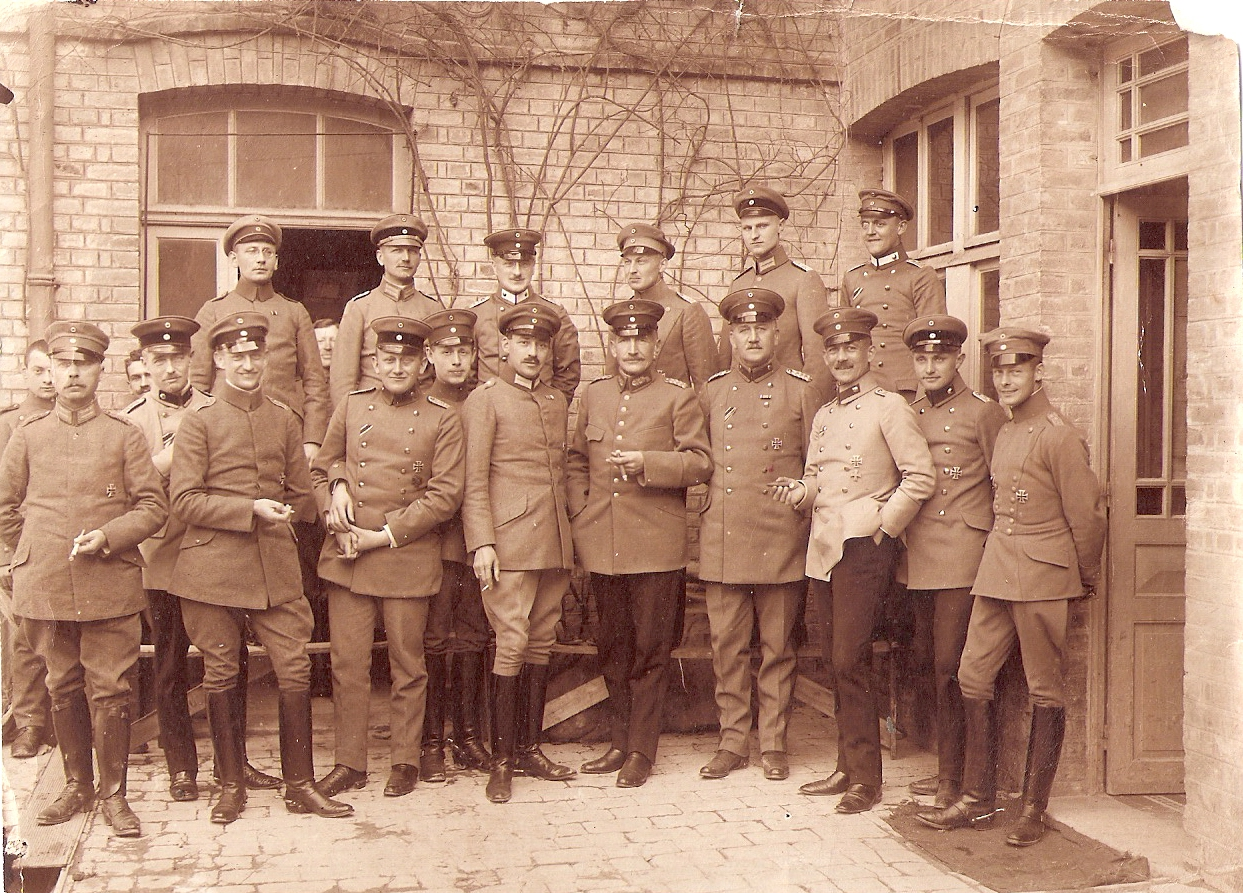
Staff of the division in 1917 front/middle the commanding General Maj.Gen. Teetzmann (with cigar)

- 68. Infanterie-Brigade
  - Infanterie-Regiment Graf Werder (4. Rheinisches) Nr. 30
  - 4. Magdeburgisches Infanterie-Regiment Nr. 67
  - Königs-Infanterie-Regiment (6. Lothringisches) Nr. 145
  - MG-Scharfschützen-Abteilung Nr. 44
- 5.Eskadron/Jäger-zu-Pferd-Regiment Nr. 12
- Artillerie-Kommandeur 34:
  - 4. Lothringisches Feldartillerie-Regiment Nr. 70
  - III. Bataillon/Fußartillerie-Regiment von Dieskau (Niederschlesisches) Nr. 6
- Stab Pionier-Bataillon Nr. 132:
  - 2.Kompanie/1. Lothringisches Pionier-Bataillon Nr. 16
  - 3.Kompanie/1. Lothringisches Pionier-Bataillon Nr. 16
  - Minenwerfer-Kompanie Nr. 34
- Divisions-Nachrichten-Kommandeur 34
