= 39th Division (German Empire) =

39th Division (39. Division); from August 2, 1914, 39th Infantry Division (39. Infanterie-Division)
- Active: 1899–1919
- Country: Prussia/Germany
- Branch: Army
- Type: Infantry (in peacetime included cavalry)
- Size: Approx. 15,000
- Part of: XV Army Corps (XV. Armeekorps)
- Garrison/HQ: Colmar
- Engagements: World War I: Battle of the Frontiers, Race to the Sea, Battle of the Yser, Battle of Verdun, Battle of the Somme, Second Battle of the Aisne, Passchendaele, German spring offensive

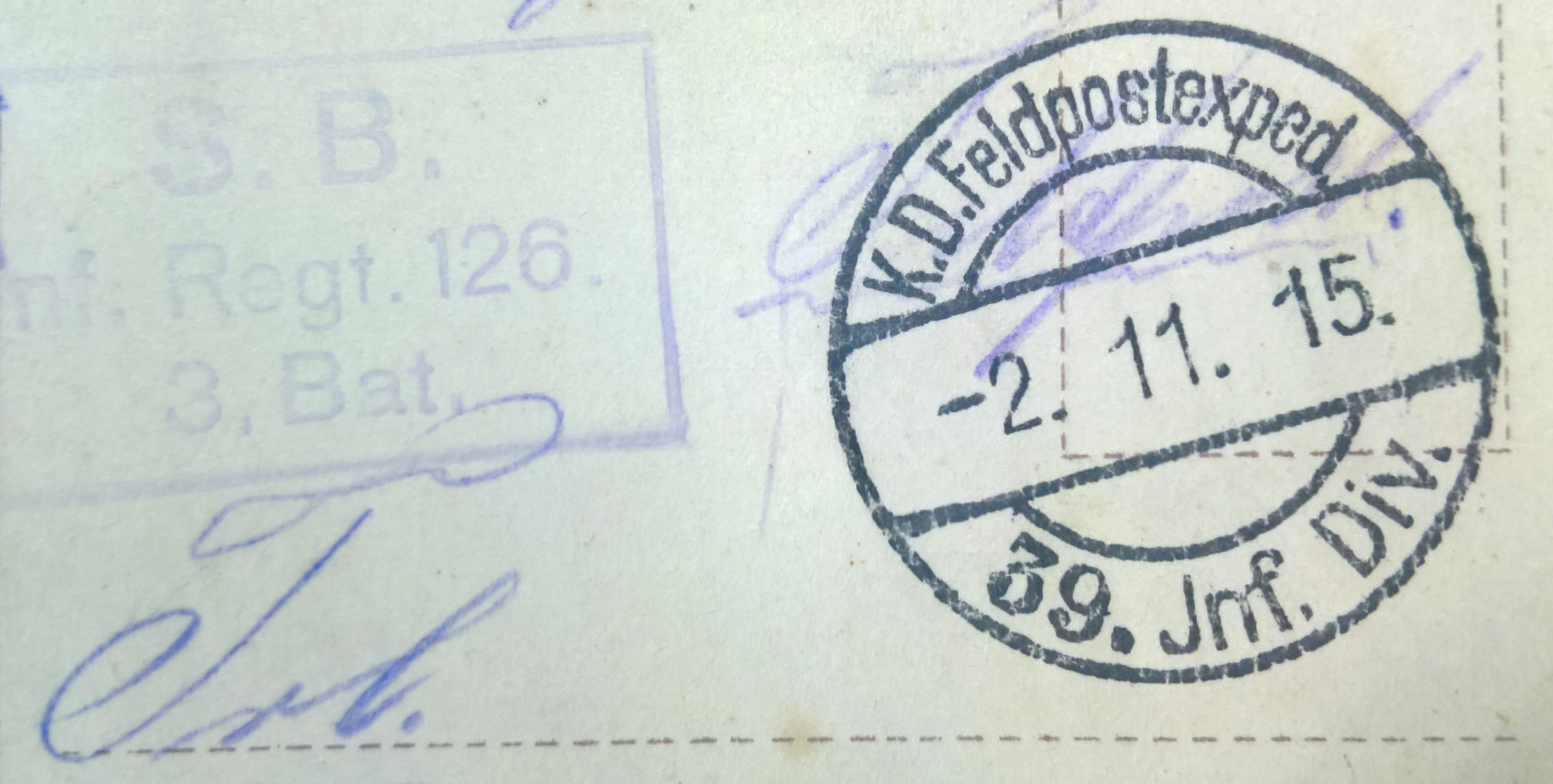
Field postmark of the 39th Infantry Division from November 2, 1915

The 39th Division (39. Division) was a unit of the Prussian/German Army. It was formed on April 1, 1899, and headquartered in Colmar (now in France). The division was subordinated in peacetime initially to the XIV Army Corps (XIV. Armeekorps) and later to the XV Army Corps (XV. Armeekorps). The division was disbanded in 1919 during the demobilization of the German Army after World War I.

== Recruitment ==
The division was a mixed unit: its Prussian elements, although designated Upper Alsatian, were mainly raised in the more densely populated Rhine Province and the Province of Westphalia, as the Alsatian German population was insufficient to support all the units stationed there. The 126th Infantry Regiment originated from the Kingdom of Württemberg. The 66th Field Artillery Regiment came from the Grand Duchy of Baden, and the 14th Jäger Battalion, which was attached upon mobilization from the XIV Army Corps, was from the Grand Duchy of Mecklenburg-Schwerin.

== Combat chronicle ==
The division began World War I by fighting in the Battle of the Frontiers, followed by participation in the Race to the Sea, which culminated in the Battle of the Yser. The division remained on the Yser front until January 1916, when it was transferred to the Verdun area. It then engaged in the Battle of Verdun and later saw action in the final phases of the Battle of the Somme. During the first half of 1917, the division was stationed in the trenches of Champagne and participated in the Second Battle of the Aisne, also known as the Third Battle of Champagne (referred to by the Germans as the Double Battle Aisne-Champagne). The division then moved to Flanders and took part in the Battle of Passchendaele. In 1918, it fought in the German spring offensive and remained in the Flanders region during the subsequent Allied offensives. Allied intelligence rated the division as second-class.

== Pre-World War I organization ==
The organization of the 39th Division in 1914, shortly before the outbreak of World War I, was as follows:

- 61. Infanterie-Brigade
  - Infanterie-Regiment Nr. 126 Großherzog Friedrich von Baden (8. Württembergisches)
  - 1. Unter-Elsässisches Infanterie-Regiment Nr. 132
- 82. Infanterie-Brigade
  - 2. Ober-Elsässiches Infanterie-Regiment Nr. 171
  - 3. Ober-Elsässiches Infanterie-Regiment Nr. 172
- 39. Kavallerie-Brigade
  - Kurmärkisches Dragoner-Regiment Nr. 14
  - Jäger-Regiment zu Pferde Nr. 3
- 39. Feldartillerie-Brigade
  - 4. Badisches Feldartillerie-Regiment Nr. 66
  - 3. Ober-Elsässisches Feldartillerie-Regiment Nr. 80

== Order of battle on mobilization ==
On mobilization in August 1914, at the beginning of World War I, most divisional cavalry, including brigade headquarters, was withdrawn to form cavalry divisions or was split among divisions as reconnaissance units. Divisions received engineer companies and other support units from their higher headquarters. The 39th Division was redesignated as the 39th Infantry Division. Its initial wartime organization was as follows:

- 61st Infantry Brigade
  - Infantry Regiment No. 126 "Grand Duke Friedrich of Baden" (8th Württemberg)
  - 1st Lower Alsatian Infantry Regiment No. 132
- 82nd Infantry Brigade
  - 2nd Upper Alsatian Infantry Regiment No. 171
  - 3rd Upper Alsatian Infantry Regiment No. 172
  - Grand Ducal Mecklenburg Jäger Battalion No. 14
- Kurmärkisches Dragoon Regiment No. 14
- 39th Field Artillery Brigade
  - 4th Baden Field Artillery Regiment No. 66
  - 3rd Upper Alsatian Field Artillery Regiment No. 80
- Engineer Units
  - 2nd Company/1st Alsatian Pioneer Battalion No. 15
  - 3rd Company/1st Alsatian Pioneer Battalion No. 15

== Late World War I organization ==
Divisions underwent many changes during the war, with regiments moving from division to division, and some being destroyed and rebuilt. Throughout the conflict, most divisions became triangular, consisting of one infantry brigade with three infantry regiments instead of two infantry brigades of two regiments (a "square division"). An artillery commander replaced the artillery brigade headquarters, the cavalry was further reduced, the engineer contingent was increased, and a divisional signals command was created. The order of battle for the 39th Infantry Division on February 20, 1918, was as follows:

- 61st Infantry Brigade
  - Infantry Regiment No. 126 "Grand Duke Friedrich of Baden" (8th Württemberg)
  - 1st Lower Alsatian Infantry Regiment No. 132
  - 3rd Upper Alsatian Infantry Regiment No. 172
  - Machine Gun Sharpshooter Battalion No. 19
- 1st Squadron/Reserve Hussar Regiment No. 8
- Artillery Commander 39
  - 3rd Upper Alsatian Field Artillery Regiment No. 80
  - Foot Artillery Battalion No. 406
- Headquarters Pioneer Battalion No. 136
  - 2nd Company/1st Alsatian Pioneer Battalion No. 15
  - 3rd Company/1st Alsatian Pioneer Battalion No. 15
  - Mortar Company No. 39
- Divisional Signals Commander 39
