= Berthold von Deimling =

German general (1853–1944)

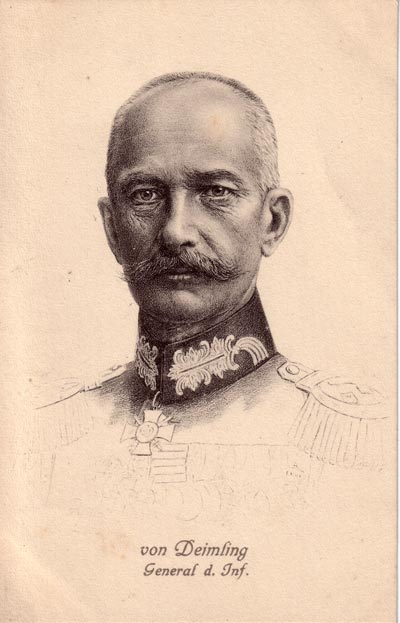
- Berthold von Deimling
- Born: 21 March 1853; Karlsruhe, Grand Duchy of Baden
- Died: 3 February 1944 (aged 90); Baden-Baden, Germany
- Military career
- Allegiance: Baden; German Empire
- Branch: Imperial German Army
- Service years: 1871–1917
- Rank: General der Infantarie
- Nickname: Butcher of Ypres
- Commands: 112th Infantry Regiment; Schutztruppe of German South West Africa; 58th Infantry Brigade; 29th Division; XV Corps
- Conflicts: Herero Wars; World War I: Battle of Mulhouse; First Battle of Ypres; Battle of Verdun; Battle of the Somme
- Awards: Pour le Mérite

Berthold Karl Adolf von Deimling (21 March 1853 – 3 February 1944) was a general officer of the German Army during World War I.

Deimling entered the army in 1871, following the Franco-Prussian War, and after working on the General Staff and in German South-West Africa rose to command a brigade of infantry in 1907. During the Herero and Nama genocide he was initially a hardliner, railing against "humanitarian stupidity", but changed his position in 1906 after being put in command in Africa.

On the outbreak of the First World War, Deimling was in command of the XV Corps near the Swiss border and commanded them during the Battle of Mulhouse. He would later command forces in the First Battle of Ypres, the Battle of Verdun and the Battle of the Somme. He was awarded the Pour le Mérite on 28 August 1916.

After the war Deimling became a committed pacifist and a member of the board of directors of the German Peace Society (DFG). He was a member of the German Democratic Party. He died in Baden-Baden.

== See also ==
- Saverne Affair
