= XV Corps (German Empire) =

XV Army Corps XV. Armee-Korps
- Flag of the Staff of a Generalkommando (1871–1918)
- Active: March 1871–1919
- Country: German Empire
- Type: Corps
- Size: Approximately 44,000 (on mobilisation in 1914)
- Garrison/HQ: Strasbourg/Brandgasse 11
- Shoulder strap piping: Red
- Engagements: World War I Battle of the Frontiers Battle of Mulhouse First Battle of Ypres

Insignia
- Abbreviation: XV AK

The XV Army Corps / XV AK (German: XV. Armee-Korps) was a corps level command of the German Army before and during World War I.

XV Corps served on the Western Front from the start of the war with the 7th Army. It was still in existence at the end of the war in the 19th Army, Heeresgruppe Herzog Albrecht von Württemberg on the Western Front.

== Formation ==
With the conclusion of the Franco-Prussian War and the annexation of Alsace-Lorraine, the XV Corps was formed in March 1871 with responsibility for the new Imperial provinces. Headquarters was established in Strasbourg with the constituent units drawn from the armies of the various states of the German Empire. The Corps initially covered the entire district of Alsace-Lorraine, but from April 1890 a new XVI Corps was formed in Lorraine and the Corps was restricted to Alsace.

It was assigned to the V Army Inspectorate which became the 7th Army at the start of the First World War.

== Peacetime organisation ==
The 25 peacetime corps of the German Army (Guards, I - XXI, I - III Bavarian) had a reasonably standardised organisation. Each consisted of two divisions with usually two infantry brigades, one field artillery brigade and a cavalry brigade each. Each brigade normally consisted of two regiments of the appropriate type, so each Corps normally commanded 8 infantry, 4 field artillery and 4 cavalry regiments. There were exceptions to this rule:

V, VI, VII, IX and XIV Corps each had a 5th infantry brigade (so 10 infantry regiments)
II, XIII, XVIII and XXI Corps had a 9th infantry regiment
I, VI and XVI Corps had a 3rd cavalry brigade (so 6 cavalry regiments)
the Guards Corps had 11 infantry regiments (in 5 brigades) and 8 cavalry regiments (in 4 brigades).

Each Corps also directly controlled a number of other units. This could include one or more

Foot Artillery Regiment
Jäger Battalion
Pioneer Battalion
Train Battalion

Peacetime organization of the Corps
Corps	Division	Brigade	Units	Garrison
XV Corps	30th Division	60th Infantry Brigade	99th (2nd Upper Rhenish) Infantry	Saverne, III Bn at Phalsbourg
XV Corps	30th Division	60th Infantry Brigade	143rd (4th Lower Alsasian) Infantry	Strasbourg, III at Mutzig
XV Corps	30th Division	85th Infantry Brigade	105th (6th Royal Saxon) Infantry "King William II of Württemberg"	Strasbourg
XV Corps	30th Division	85th Infantry Brigade	136th (4th Lotharingian) Infantry	Strasbourg
XV Corps	30th Division	30th Field Artillery Brigade	51st (2nd Upper Alsatian) Field Artillery	Strasbourg
XV Corps	30th Division	30th Field Artillery Brigade	84th (Strasbourg) Field Artillery	Strasbourg
XV Corps	30th Division	30th Cavalry Brigade	15th (3rd Silesian) Dragoons	Haguenau
XV Corps	30th Division	30th Cavalry Brigade	9th (2nd Rhenish) Hussars	Strasbourg
XV Corps	39th Division	61st Infantry Brigade	126th (8th Württemberg) Infantry "Grand Duke Frederick of Baden"	Strasbourg
XV Corps	39th Division	61st Infantry Brigade	132nd (1st Lower Alsatian) Infantry	Strasbourg
XV Corps	39th Division	82nd Infantry Brigade	171st (2nd Upper Alsatian) Infantry	Colmar
XV Corps	39th Division	82nd Infantry Brigade	172nd (3rd Upper Alsatian) Infantry	Neuf-Brisach
XV Corps	39th Division	39th Field Artillery Brigade	66th (4th Baden) Field Artillery	Lahr, Neuf-Brisach
XV Corps	39th Division	39th Field Artillery Brigade	80th (3rd Upper Alsatian) Field Artillery	Colmar, Neuf-Brisach
XV Corps	39th Division	39th Cavalry Brigade	14th (Kurmark) Dragoons	Colmar
XV Corps	39th Division	39th Cavalry Brigade	3rd Jäger zu Pferde	Colmar
XV Corps	Corps Troops		8th (Rhenish) Jäger Battalion	Sélestat
XV Corps	Corps Troops		14th (Grand Duchy Mecklenburg) Jäger Battalion	Colmar
XV Corps	Corps Troops		9th Fortress Machine Gun Abteilung	Strasbourg
XV Corps	Corps Troops		10th Fortress Machine Gun Abteilung	Mutzig
XV Corps	Corps Troops		10th (Lower Saxony) Foot Artillery	Strasbourg
XV Corps	Corps Troops		13th (Hohenzollern) Foot Artillery	Ulm, Breisach
XV Corps	Corps Troops		14th (Baden) Foot Artillery	Strasbourg
XV Corps	Corps Troops		15th (1st Alsatian) Pioneer Battalion	Strasbourg
XV Corps	Corps Troops		19th (2nd Alsatian) (Fortress-) Pioneer Battalion	Strasbourg
XV Corps	Corps Troops		4th Fortress Telephone Company	Strasbourg
XV Corps	Corps Troops		4th Flying Battalion	Straßburg, Metz, Freiburg im Breisgau
XV Corps	Corps Troops		15th (Alsatian) Train Battalion	Strasbourg

== World War I ==
=== Organisation on mobilisation ===
On mobilization on 2 August 1914 the Corps was restructured. 30th Cavalry Brigade was withdrawn to form part of the 7th Cavalry Division and the 39th Cavalry Brigade was broken up and its regiments assigned to the divisions as reconnaissance units. Divisions received engineer companies and other support units from the Corps headquarters. In summary, XV Corps mobilised with 26 infantry battalions, 10 machine gun companies (60 machine guns), 8 cavalry squadrons, 24 field artillery batteries (144 guns), 4 heavy artillery batteries (16 guns), 3 pioneer companies and an aviation detachment.

Initial wartime organization of the Corps
Corps	Division	Brigade	Units
XV Corps	30th Division	60th Infantry Brigade	99th Infantry Regiment
XV Corps	30th Division	60th Infantry Brigade	143rd Infantry Regiment
XV Corps	30th Division	85th Infantry Brigade	105th Infantry Regiment
XV Corps	30th Division	85th Infantry Brigade	136th Infantry Regiment
XV Corps	30th Division	30th Field Artillery Brigade	51st Field Artillery Regiment
XV Corps	30th Division	30th Field Artillery Brigade	84th Field Artillery Regiment
XV Corps	30th Division		3rd Jäger zu Pferde Regiment
XV Corps	30th Division		1st Company, 15th Pioneer Battalion
XV Corps	30th Division		30th Divisional Pontoon Train
XV Corps	30th Division		1st Medical Company
XV Corps	30th Division		3rd Medical Company
XV Corps	39th Division	61st Infantry Brigade	126th Infantry Regiment
XV Corps	39th Division	61st Infantry Brigade	132nd Infantry Regiment
XV Corps	39th Division	61st Infantry Brigade	8th Jäger Battalion
XV Corps	39th Division	82nd Infantry Brigade	171st Infantry Regiment
XV Corps	39th Division	82nd Infantry Brigade	172nd Infantry Regiment
XV Corps	39th Division	82nd Infantry Brigade	14th Jäger Battalion
XV Corps	39th Division	39th Field Artillery Brigade	66th Field Artillery Regiment
XV Corps	39th Division	39th Field Artillery Brigade	80th Field Artillery Regiment
XV Corps	39th Division		14th Dragoon Regiment
XV Corps	39th Division		2nd Company, 15th Pioneer Battalion
XV Corps	39th Division		3rd Company, 15th Pioneer Battalion
XV Corps	39th Division		39th Divisional Pontoon Train
XV Corps	39th Division		2nd Medical Company
XV Corps	Corps Troops		II Battalion, 10th Foot Artillery Regiment
XV Corps	Corps Troops		3rd Aviation Detachment
XV Corps	Corps Troops		15th Corps Pontoon Train
XV Corps	Corps Troops		15th Telephone Detachment
XV Corps	Corps Troops		15th Pioneer Searchlight Section
XV Corps	Corps Troops		Munition Trains and Columns corresponding to II Corps

=== Combat chronicle ===
At the outbreak of World War I, the Corps was assigned to the 7th Army on the left of the forces that executed the Schlieffen Plan. It fought on the Western Front in Lorraine. It was still in existence at the end of the war in the 19th Army, Heeresgruppe Herzog Albrecht von Württemberg on the Western Front.

== Commanders ==
The XV Corps had the following commanders during its existence:

Dates	Rank	Name
20 March 1871	General der Infanterie	Eduard von Fransecky
1 November 1879	Generalfeldmarschall	Edwin Freiherr von Manteuffel
16 September 1885	General der Kavallerie	Wilhelm von Heuduck
4 November 1890	General der Artillerie	Alfred von Lewinski
1 April 1892	General der Infanterie	Wilhelm Hermann von Blume
4 April 1896	General der Infanterie	Kuno Freiherr von Falkenstein
22 May 1899	Generalleutnant	Emil Freiherr von Meerscheidt-Hüllessem
6 June 1900	Generalleutnant	Hans Anton Herwarth von Bittenfeld
1 April 1903	General der Infanterie	Leopold Ritter Hentschel von Gilgenheimb
31 January 1910	General der Infanterie	Max von Fabeck
1 March 1913	General der Infanterie	Berthold von Deimling
25 May 1917	Generalleutnant	Emil Ilse

== See also ==
- German Army order of battle (1914)
- German Army order of battle, Western Front (1918)
- List of Imperial German infantry regiments
- List of Imperial German artillery regiments
- List of Imperial German cavalry regiments

== Bibliography ==
- Cron, Hermann (2002). Imperial German Army 1914-18: Organisation, Structure, Orders-of-Battle [first published: 1937]. Helion & Co. ISBN 1-874622-70-1.
- Ellis, John; Cox, Michael (1993). The World War I Databook. Aurum Press Ltd. ISBN 1-85410-766-6.
- Haythornthwaite, Philip J. (1996). The World War One Source Book. Arms and Armour. ISBN 1-85409-351-7.
- Histories of Two Hundred and Fifty-One Divisions of the German Army which Participated in the War (1914-1918), compiled from records of Intelligence section of the General Staff, American Expeditionary Forces, at General Headquarters, Chaumont, France 1919. The London Stamp Exchange Ltd. 1989 [1920]. ISBN 0-948130-87-3.
- The German Forces in the Field; 7th Revision, 11th November 1918; Compiled by the General Staff, War Office. Imperial War Museum, London and the Battery Press. 1995 [1918]. ISBN 978-1-870423-95-3.
