= 30th Division (German Empire) =

30th Division (30. Division); from August 2, 1914, 30th Infantry Division (30. Infanterie-Division)
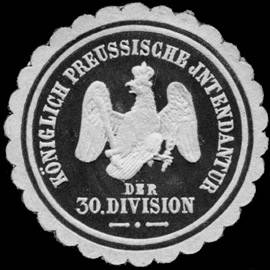
- One of the seal marks of the 30th Division
- Active: 1 April 1887-1919
- Country: Prussia/German Empire
- Branch: Imperial German Army
- Type: Infantry (in peacetime included cavalry)
- Size: Approx. 15,000 men
- Part of: XV. Army Corps (XV. Armeekorps)
- Garrison/HQ: Strasbourg
- Engagements: World War I: Battle of the Frontiers; Race to the Sea; Battle of Verdun; Battle of the Somme; Second Battle of the Aisne; First Battle of Cambrai; Champagne-Marne; Second Battle of Cambrai

The 30th Division (30. Division) was a unit of the Prussian/German Army. It was formed on April 1, 1887, as the 33rd Division and became the 30th Division on April 1, 1890, and was headquartered in Straßburg (now Strasbourg, France). The division was subordinated in peacetime to the XV Army Corps (XV. Armeekorps). The division was disbanded in 1919 during the demobilization of the German Army after World War I. The division was recruited primarily in the Rhineland and Westphalia, with the 105th Infantry Regiment recruited in the Kingdom of Saxony.

== Combat chronicle ==
The division served in World War I on the Western Front. It saw action in the Battle of the Frontiers and in the Race for the Sea. It fought in the two major battles of 1916, the Battle of Verdun and the Battle of the Somme. In 1917, it fought in the Second Battle of the Aisne and the tank battle of Cambrai. In 1918, it fought in the Battle of Champagne-Marne and the Second Battle of Cambrai. Until the last campaigns of the war, the division was regarded as a first class division.

== Pre–World War I organization ==
The organization of the 30th Division in 1914, shortly before the outbreak of World War I, was as follows:

- 60. Infanterie-Brigade
  - 2. Oberrheinisches Infanterie-Regiment Nr. 99
  - 4. Unter-Elsässisches Infanterie-Regiment Nr. 143
- 85. Infanterie-Brigade
  - Kgl. Sächs. 6. Infanterie-Regiment König Wilhelm II. von Württemberg Nr. 105
  - 4. Lothringisches Infanterie-Regiment Nr. 136
- 30. Kavallerie-Brigade
  - 3. Schleschisches Dragoner-Regiment Nr. 15
  - 2. Rheinisches Husaren-Regiment Nr. 9
- 30. Feldartillerie-Brigade
  - 2. Ober-Elsässisches Feldartillerie-Regiment Nr. 51
  - Straßburger Feldartillerie-Regiment Nr. 84

== Order of battle on mobilization ==
On mobilization in August 1914 at the beginning of World War I, most divisional cavalry, including brigade headquarters, was withdrawn to form cavalry divisions or split up among divisions as reconnaissance units. Divisions received engineer companies and other support units from their higher headquarters. The 30th Division was redesignated the 30th Infantry Division. Its initial wartime organization was as follows:

- 60. Infanterie-Brigade
  - 2. Oberrheinisches Infanterie-Regiment Nr. 99
  - 4. Unter-Elsässisches Infanterie-Regiment Nr. 143
- 85. Infanterie-Brigade
  - Kgl. Sächs. 6. Infanterie-Regiment König Wilhelm II. von Württemberg Nr. 105
  - 4. Lothringisches Infanterie-Regiment Nr. 136
- Jäger-Regiment zu Pferde Nr. 3
- 30. Feldartillerie-Brigade
  - 2. Ober-Elsässisches Feldartillerie-Regiment Nr. 51
  - Straßburger Feldartillerie-Regiment Nr. 84
- Reserve-Ulanen-Regiment Nr. 601
- 1.Kompanie/1. Elsässisches Pionier-Bataillon Nr. 15

== Late World War I organization ==
Divisions underwent many changes during the war, with regiments moving from division to division, and some being destroyed and rebuilt. During the war, most divisions became triangular - one infantry brigade with three infantry regiments rather than two infantry brigades of two regiments (a "square division"). An artillery commander replaced the artillery brigade headquarters, the cavalry was further reduced, the engineer contingent was increased, and a divisional signals command was created. The 30th Infantry Division's order of battle on April 1, 1918, was as follows:

- 60. Infanterie-Brigade
  - 2. Oberrheinisches Infanterie-Regiment Nr. 99
  - Kgl. Sächs. 6. Infanterie-Regiment König Wilhelm II. von Württemberg Nr. 105
  - 4. Unter-Elsässisches Infanterie-Regiment Nr. 143
- 2.Eskadron/Husaren-Regiment Kaiser Nikolaus II von Rußland (1. Westfälisches) Nr. 8
- Artillerie-Kommandeur 30
  - Reserve-Feldartillerie-Regiment Nr. 84
  - Kgl. Bayerisches 10. Fußartillerie-Bataillon
- Stab 1. Elsässisches Pionier-Bataillon Nr. 15
  - 1.Kompanie/Elsässisches Pionier-Bataillon Nr. 15
  - 5.Kompanie/Elsässisches Pionier-Bataillon Nr. 15
  - Minenwerfer-Kompanie Nr. 29
- Divisions-Nachrichten-Kommandeur 30
