= Battle of Nouart =

- Part of Franco-Prussian War
Date	29 August 1870
Location	Nouart, Ardennes, France
Result	German Victory, French Withdrawal

Belligerents
French Empire	North German Confederation: Saxony

Commanders and leaders
Pierre Louis Charles de Failly	Prince Georg

Units involved
V Corps	XII Corps; 46th Infantry Brigade of the 12th Royal Saxony Corps

Strength
Unknown	Unknown

Casualties and losses
Unknown	14 officers and 349 soldiers casualties

The Battle of Nouart was fought on 29 August 1870 at the village of Nouart. Part of the Franco-Prussian War of 1870–1871, the battle saw Prince George's 46th Infantry Brigade of the XII Royal Saxony Corps defeat Pierre Louis Charles de Failly's V Corps of the French Empire.

== Prelude ==
After being defeated in the bloody Battle of Gravelotte, French Marshal François Achille Bazaine's army was besieged in Metz on 19 August 1870. Field Marshal Mac-Mahon pulled his army out of the barracks to aid Bazaine and his army. Meanwhile, on 23 August, German armies began their march down Châlons. Mac-Mahon's troops were detected three days later on 26 August; the Germany army was ordered to advance north to meet them. The Battle of Buzancy on 27 August saw the cavalry brigade of the Saxon 12th army defeat the French cavalry. Fearing that the Germans would block his advance, Mac-Mahon decided to withdraw to Mézières that night. Nonetheless, urgent orders the following day compelled Mac-Mahon to follow through on the original plan to rescue Bazaine.

The Germans indeed blocked Mac-Mahon's army at the Meuse River, leading him to take an alternate crossing at Mouzon and Rémilly.

== Battle ==
The French V Corps, led by de Failly, crossed the Meuse at Mouzon. Shortly after they came under heavy infantry and artillery fire when their cavalry squadron marched a few miles ahead of the main force near the hills of Nouart. The French cavalry fled from the heights and returned to the now panicking French infantry. The French discovered that the XII Royal Saxony Corps were fully deployed on the hillsides, and de Failly had to stop his advance to put infantry and artillery in place.

The Germany and French infantry approached each other, fighting over the small valley of Wiseppe all afternoon. Fierce infantry and artillery raids broke out during the battle, and the Saxons gained the advantage. While their original intention was to merely disrupt and hold back the French for an hour, lessons from the Battle of Gravelotte influenced Prince George's decision to attempt to encircle the French. Casualties totaled 600 people on both sides.

As night fell, the French made a six hour long retreat through the woods to Beaumont. The Germans did not pursue.

== Aftermath ==
The fighting in Nouart, alongside a less drastic skirmish at outposts in Buzancy, and an earlier skirmish at Attigny to the rear, alerted Mac-Mahon to the presence of German forces. The following day, de Failly was defeated at the Battle of Beaumont with the help of the I Royal Bavarian Corps, and Mac-Mahon was forced to withdraw to Sedan that night. There, his army was eventually besieged and destroyed several days later, leading to the capture of Napoleon III and ending the Second French Empire.
