= Army of Châlons =

Armée de Châlons (1870)
- French: Armée de Châlons (1870)
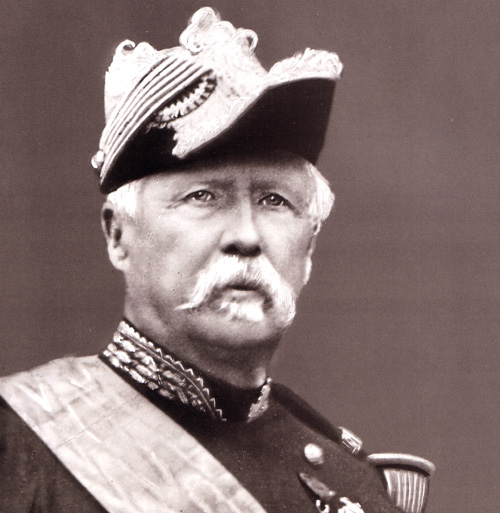
- Commander-in-Chief of the Army, Marshal MacMahon
- Active: 17 August – 2 September 1870
- Allegiance: Second French Empire
- Branch: French Army
- Type: Combined arms
- Role: Infantry, Cavalry, Engineers and Artillery
- Size: 120,000
- Part of: 1st Army Corps; 5th Army Corps; 7th Army Corps; 12th Army Corps
- Engagements: Franco-Prussian War: Battle of Beaumont; Battle of Sedan

Commanders
- Notable commanders: Maréchal MacMahon

The Army of Châlons (French: Armée de Châlons) was a French military formation that fought during the Franco-Prussian War of 1870. Formed in the camp of Châlons on August 17, 1870, from elements of the Army of the Rhine which the formation was issued from, the Army of Châlons was engaged in combats of Beaumont and Sedan while disappearing during the capitulation of September 2, 1870.

== Creation of the army ==
Following the unfortunate adventures of the Army of the Rhine (French: Armée du Rhin [1870]) in the beginning of August at Wissembourg, Wörth, Forbach, Empress Eugénie designated régente, summoned the two chambers on August 9, 1870. Three days later, the Emperor decided to confine the command of the Army of the Rhine to Marshal Bazaine.

On August 17, the Emperor was at Châlons and, during a reduced war council, the latter decided the nomination of Bazaine as généralissime of the French armed forces, of général Trochu as governor of Paris and de MacMahon as commander of the Army of Châlons. Accordingly, this new army constituted of available elements, composed the 1st Corps, which joined the camp of Châlons between August 14 and 17, the 5th Corps of général Failly, the 7th Corps of général Douay, and the 12th Corps recently formed, constituted from infantry regiments still available, marching regiments formed by the 4 battalions left in the depot and regiments of the Guard. Accordingly, the four armed corps were assembled at Reims on August 20, 1870.

== Chronology of operations ==
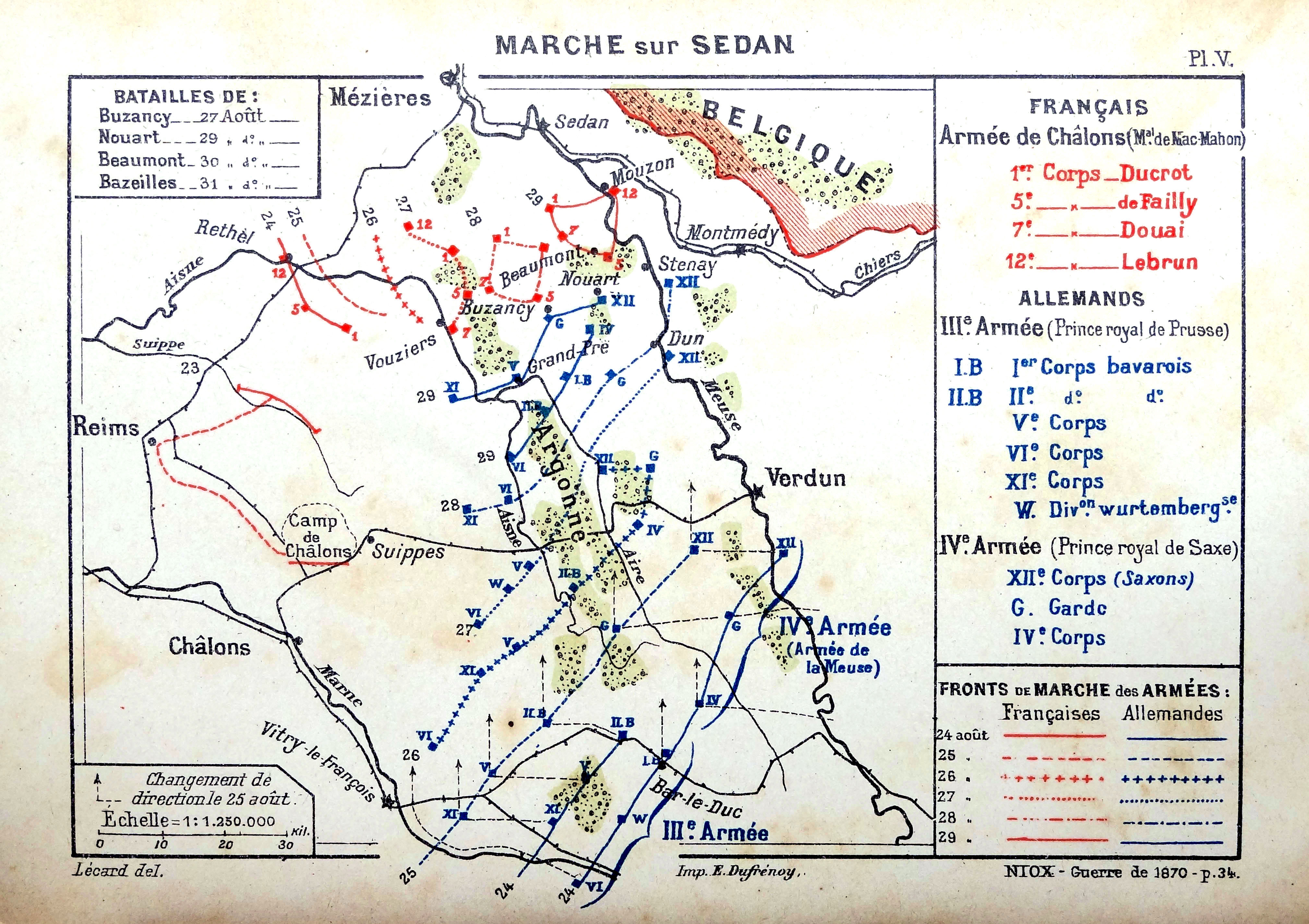
March on Sedan of the Army of Châlons

While Mac Mahon wished to retreat on Paris in order to reconstitute his army, consultations convinced him of rescuing Bazaine which unfolded on Metz following new engagements at Rezonville and Saint-Privat on August 16 and 18. Mac Mahon decided on August 23 to leave Reims and marched towards the north-east in order to pass Meuse between Sedan and Verdun.

While the four corps of Mac Mahon made way north-east, the German Army, strong of previous successes reorganized in two groups:

- In front of Metz, the Ist Army, four corps of the IInd and one division.
- Opposed to the Army of Châlons, the IIIrd Army, constituted of five corps, was associated to a new army, the Army of the Meuse or IV army, composed of three army corps and four cavalry divisions. The ensemble represented 188000 fantassins, 36000 cavaliers and more than 810 pieces of artillery.

The progression of the French Army was slow, and the latter was caught up by the German troops before reaching Meuse. On the 29, following a first confrontation at Nouart with the XII Corps Saxon, the 5th corps of de Failly garrisoned at Beaumont. Around noon time, on August 30, the first shells hit the camp. Three German armed corps engaged the troops of Beaumont: the I. Bayerischen Korps on the left, the IV. Armee-Korps (Prussian) at the center and the sächsisches XII. Armee-Corps to the right. Despite the resistance of the infantry and the relaunching of combats at Mouzon with the unfortunate heroic charge of the 5th Cuirassiers, the corps of de Failly was defeated and had to retreat on Sedan.

The battle of Beaumont had for consequence the renunciation of Marshal Mac Mahon to come and rescue Bazaine at Metz. Contrary, he unfolded since August 30 the different corps on the cities of Bazeilles and Sedan.

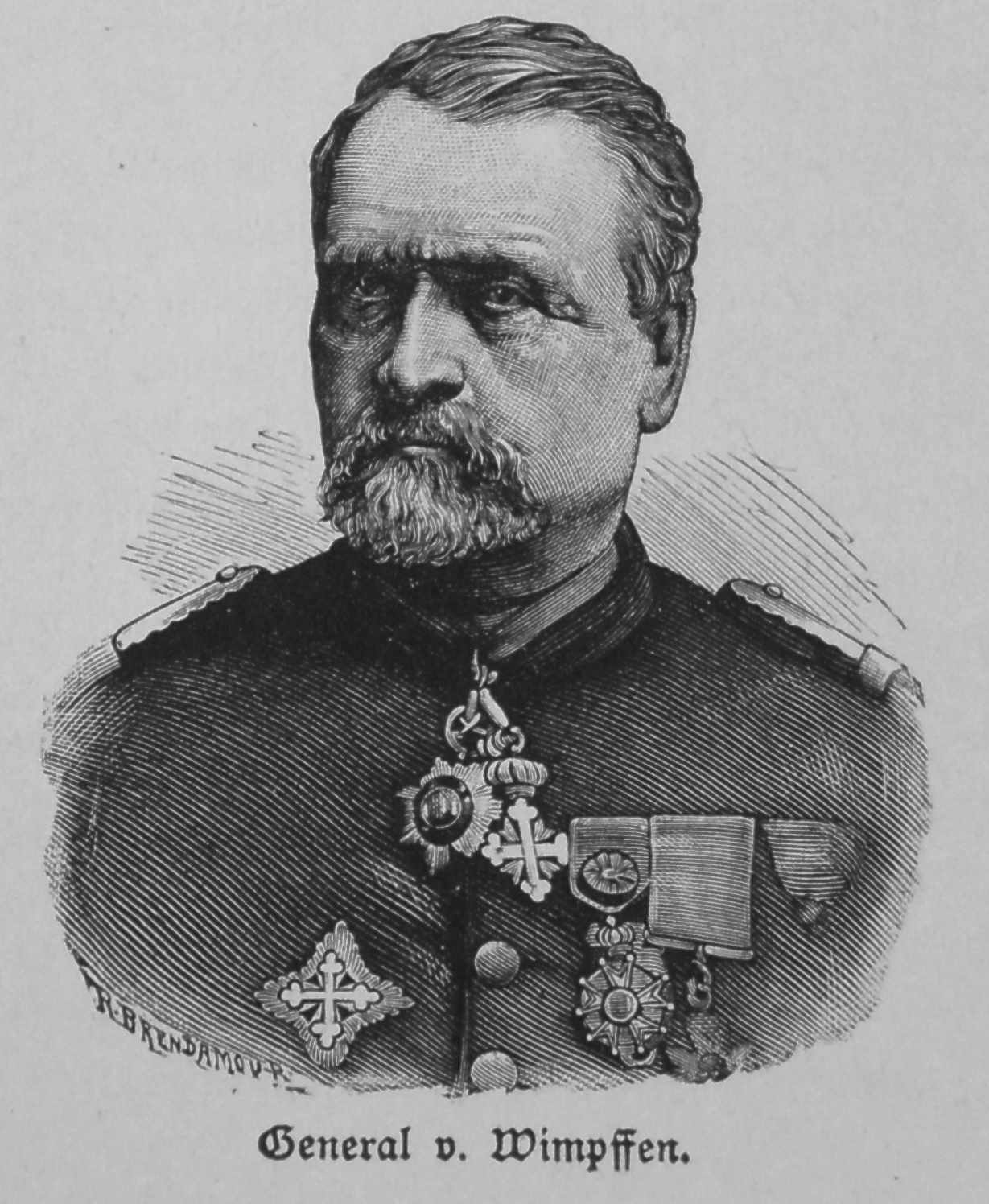
Général Wimpffen, commander-in-chief of the Army of Châlons at Sedan.

On the 31st, the I. Bayerischen Korps of général Von der Tann confronted the 12th Corps while apprehending the pont de chemin de fer which was along Meuse south of Bazeilles. The next day, on September 1, 1870, the IIIrd and IV German corps attacked the ensemble of the armies of Mac Mahon positioned in the two cities. The marshal was wounded while searching to join the command of the 12th Corps, général Lebrun, attacked by the Ist Corps Bavarois at Bazeilles. First replaced by général Ducrot, the command of the army was replaced, under orders of the minister of war, to général Winpffen, recently named at the head of the 5th Army Corps. The German Army finished by encircling the ensemble of the army which unfolded on the citadelle in Sedan. On the morning of September 2, the capitulation was in effect. This battle witnessed the disappearing of the Army of Châlons, which consisted the loss of 124.000 men for France.

== Composition and order of battle ==
On August 23, 1870, the Army of Châlons was constituted of four Army Corps along with artillery and cavalry reserves, consisting of 105.000 fantassins, 14.709 cavaliers, 393 pieces of artillery and 76 mitrailleuses. Lieutenant-colonel Rousset gave a, estimative decomposition by grand units:

Army of Châlons
	Fantassins	Cavaliers	Artillery	Mitrailleuses
1st Army Corps	26,000	2,500	84	22
5th Army Corps	18,000	1,496	61	18
7th Army Corps	25,000	2,400	78	18
12th Army Corps	36,000	4,200	150	18
Reserve cavalry	-	4,113	14	-
Reserve artillery	-	-	6	-

=== Commandement & état-major ===
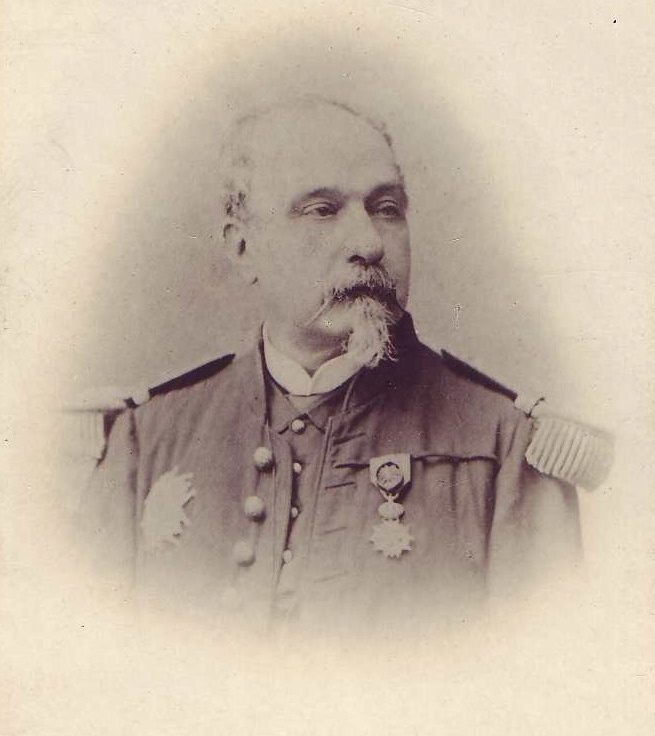
Général Forgeot, commander of the artillery.

- Commander-in-chief : Marshal Mac Mahon, duc de Magenta then général Wimpffen (Septembre 1)
- Chef d'état-major général : général Faure
- Commander of the Artillery : général Forgeot
- Commander of the Engineers : général Dejean
- Intendant général : intendant général Vigo-Roussillon

=== 1st Army Corps ===
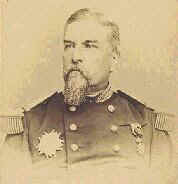
Général Ducrot, commander of the 1st Army Corps.

The 1st Army Corps (French: 1^{er} Corps d'Armée) was commanded by général Ducrot, with headquarter staff, colonel Robert. Général Ducrot, former regimental commander of the 1st Division, succeeded Marshal Mac Mahon which recently assumed the command of the Army of Châlons. Général Frigola commanded the artillery.

1st Infantry Division

The 1st Infantry Division of the 1st Army Corps was under the orders of général Wolff

- 1st Brigade of général Moréno
  - 18th Infantry Regiment (French: 18^{e} Régiment d'Infanterie de Ligne) (Colonel Bréger, 3 battalions)
  - 96th Infantry Regiment (French: 96^{e} Régiment d'Infanterie de Ligne) (Colonel Bluem, 3 battalions)
  - 13e Bataillon de Chasseurs à Pied (French: 13^{e} Bataillon de Chasseurs à Pied) (Commandant Potier, 1 battalion)
- 2nd Brigade of général Postis du Houlbec
  - 45th Infantry Regiment (French: 45^{e} Régiment d'Infanterie de Ligne) (Lieutenant-colonel Germain, 3 battalions)
  - 1st Regiment of Zouaves (French: 1^{er} Régiment de Zouaves) (Colonel Barrachin, 3 Battalions)
- 3 Batteries of the 9th Artillery Regiment (French: 9^{e} Régiment d'Artillerie) (Lieutenant-colonel Lecoeuvre, 2 batteries de 4 and 1 de mitrailleuses) and 1 Company of the 1st Engineer Regiment (French: 1^{er} Régiment du Génie).

2nd Infantry Division

The 2nd Infantry Division of the 1st Army Corps was under the orders of général Pellé

- 1st Brigade of général Pelletier de Montmarie
  - 50th Infantry Regiment (French: 50^{e} Régiment d'Infanterie de Ligne) (Colonel Ardoin, 3 Battalions)
  - 74th Infantry Regiment (French: 74^{e} Régiment d'Infanterie de Ligne) (Colonel Theuvez, 3 Battalions)
  - 16e Bataillon de Chasseurs à Pied (French: 16^{e} Bataillon de Chasseurs à Pied) (Commandant d'Hugues, 1 Battalion)
- 2nd Brigade of général Gaudil
  - 78th Infantry Regiment (French: 78^{e} Régiment d'Infanterie de Ligne) (Colonel Pellenc, 3 Battalions)
  - 1st Algerian Tirailleurs Regiment (French: 1^{er} Régiment de Tirailleurs Algériens) (Colonel de Morandy, 3 Battalions)
  - 1st Marching Regiment (French: 1^{er} Régiment de Marche) (Colonel Lecomte, 3 Battalions)
- 3 Batteries of the 9th Artillery Regiment (French: 9^{e} Régiment d'Artillerie) (Lieutenant-colonel Cauvet, 2 batteries de 4 et 1 de mitrailleuses) and 1 Company of the 1st Engineer Regiment (French: 1^{er} Régiment du Génie).

3rd Infantry Division

The 3rd Infantry Division of the 1st Army Corps was under the orders of général l'Héritier

- 1st Infantry Brigade of général Carteret-Trécourt
  - 36th Infantry Regiment (French: 36^{e} Régiment d'Infanterie de Ligne) (Colonel Beaudoin, 3 battalions)
  - 2nd Zouaves Regiment (French: 2^{e} Régiment de Zouaves) (Colonel Détrie, 3 battalions)
  - 8e Bataillon de Chasseurs à Pied (French: 8^{e} Bataillon de Chasseurs à Pied) (Commandant Viénot, 1 battalion)
- 2nd Brigade of général Lefebvre
  - 48th Infantry Regiment (French: 48^{e} Régiment d'Infanterie de Ligne) (Colonel Rogier, 3 battalions)
  - 2nd Algerian Tirailleurs Regiment (French: 2^{e} Régiment de Tirailleurs Algériens) (Commandant Canale, 3 battalions)
  - Battalion of Franc-Tireurs of Paris (commandant Robin, 1 battalion)
- 3 Batteries of the 12 Artillery Regiment (French: 12^{e} Régiment d'Artillerie) (Lieutenant-colonel Gheguillaume, 2 batteries de 4 and 1 de mitrailleuses) and 1 Company of the 1st Engineer Regiment (French: 1^{er} Régiment du Génie).

4th Infantry Division

The 4th Infantry Division of the 1st Army Corps was under the orders of général de Lartigue

- 1st Brigade under the orders of général Fraboulet de Kerléadec
  - 56th Infantry Regiment (French: 56^{e} Régiment d'Infanterie de Ligne) (Lieutenant-colonel Billot, 3 Battalions)
  - 3rd Zouaves Regiment (French: 3^{e} Régiment de Zouaves) (Colonel Baucher, 3 battalions)
  - 1er Bataillon de Chasseurs à Pied (French: 1^{er} Bataillon de Chasseurs à Pied) (Captain Briatte, 1 Battalion)
- 2nd Brigade under the orders of général Carrey de Bellemare
  - 87th Infantry Regiment (French: 87^{e} Régiment d'Infanterie de Ligne) (Colonel Blot)
  - 2nd Marching Regiment (French: 2^{e} Régiment de Marche) (Lieutenant-colonel de Lenchey, 3 Battalions)
  - 3rd Battalion of the 3rd Imperial Guard (French: Grenadiers de la Garde Impériale) (Colonel de Souancé)
  - 3rd Algerian Tirailleurs Regiment (French: 3^{e} Régiment de Tirailleurs Algériens) (Colonel Barrué, 3 Battalions)
- 3 Batteries of the 12th Artillery Regiment (French: 12^{e} Régiment d'Artillerie) (Lieutenant-colonel Lamande, 2 batteries de 4 and 1 de mitrailleuses) and 1 Company of the 1st Engineer Regiment (French: 1^{er} Régiment du Génie).

Cavalry Division

The Cavalry Division of the 1st Army Corps was commanded by général Duhesme which was replaced on August 25 by général Michel

- 1st Brigade of général de Septeuil
  - 3rd Hussards Regiment (French: 3^{e} Régiment de Hussards) (Colonel de Vieil, 4 Squadrons)
  - 11e Régiment de Chasseurs à Cheval (French: 11^{e} Régiment de Chasseurs à Cheval) (Colonel d'Astugue, 4 squadrons)
- 2nd Brigade of général de Nansouty
  - 2nd Regiment of Lancers (French: 2^{e} Régiment de Lanciers) (Colonel de Landreville, 4 Squadrons)
  - 6th Regiment of Lancers (French: 6^{e} Régiment de Lanciers) (Colonel Tripart, 4 Squadrons)
  - 10th Dragoon Regiment (French: 10^{e} Régiment de Dragons) (Colonel Perrot, 4 Squadrons)
- 3rd Brigade of général Michel
  - 8th Cuirassiers Regiment (French: 8^{e} Régiment de Cuirassiers) and 9th Cuirassiers Regiment (French: 9^{e} Régiments de Cuirassiers) founded (Colonel Guiot de la Rochère, 4 Squadrons)

Reserve Artillery

- Artillery Reserve was under the orders of colonel Grouvel
  - 2 Batteries of the 6th Artillery Regiment (French: 6^{e} Régiment d'Artillerie)
  - 2 Batteries of the 9th Artillery Regiment (French: 9^{e} Régiment d'Artillerie)
  - 4 Batteries of the 20e Régiment d'Artillerie à Cheval(French: 20^{e} Régiment d'Artillerie à Cheval)
- 2 Companies of the 1st Engineer Regiment (French: 1^{er} Régiment du Génie)

=== 5th Army Corps ===
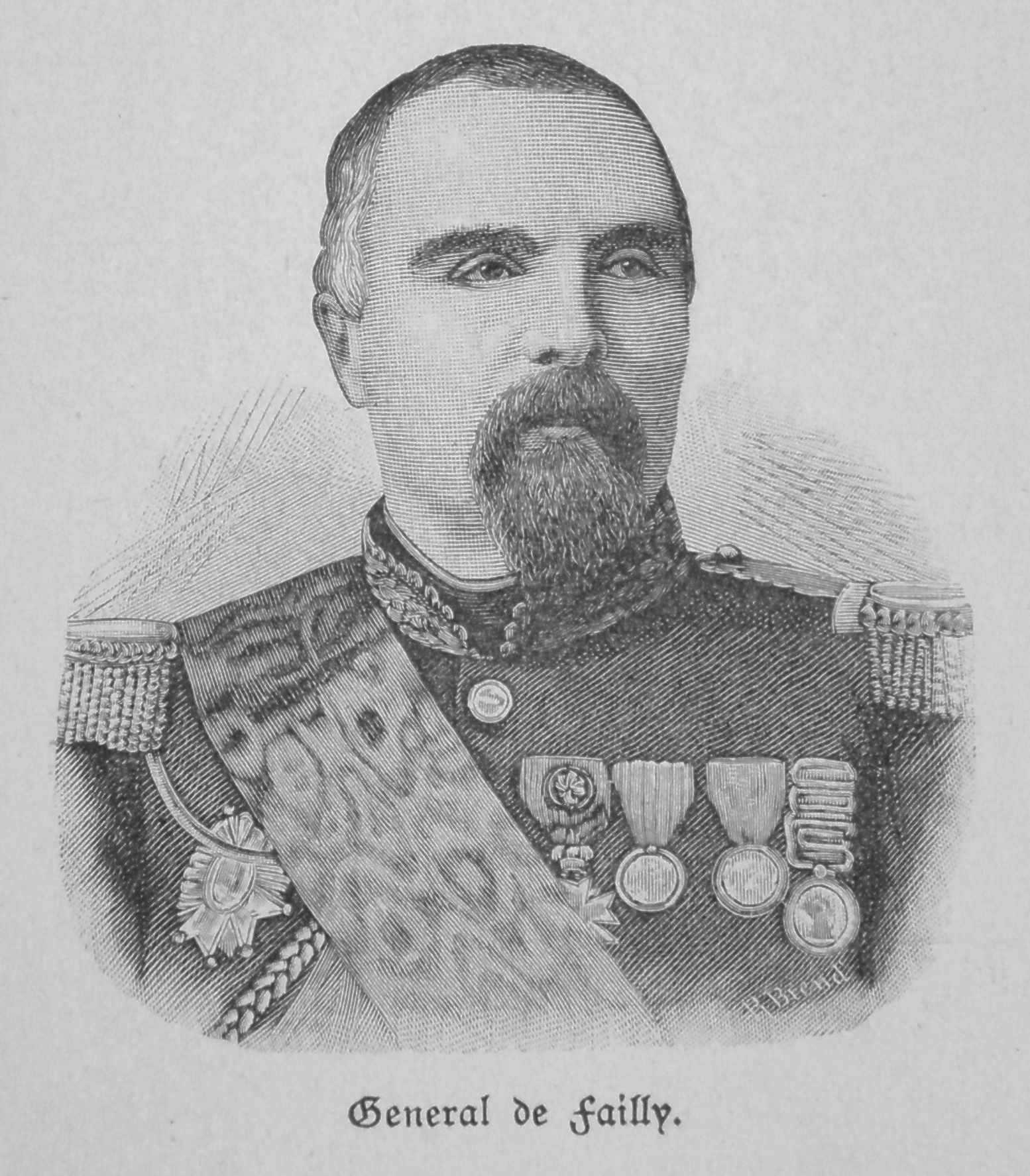
Général de Failly, commander of the 5th Army Corps.

The 5th Army Corps (French: 5^{e} Corps d'Armée) was commanded by général de Failly, with headquarter staff général Besson.

1st Infantry Division

The 1st Infantry Division of the 5th Army Corps was under the orders of général Goze.

- 1st Brigade of général Saurin
  - 11th Infantry Regiment (French: 11^{e} Régiment d'Infanterie de Ligne) (Colonel Jean-Pierre-Ferdinand de Behagle)
  - 46th Infantry Regiment (French: 46^{e} Régiment d'Infanterie de Ligne) (Colonel Michel Henri Alfred Pichon)
  - 4e Bataillon de Chasseurs à Pied (French: 4^{e} Bataillon de Chasseurs à Pied) (Commandant Guillaume Hyacinthe Foncegrives)
- 2nd Brigade of général baron Jean Nicolas Charles Valric Nicolas
  - 61st Infantry Regiment (French: 61^{e} Régiment d'Infanterie de Ligne) (Colonel du François Marie Alfred Moulin)
  - 86th Infantry Regiment (French: 86^{e} Régiment d'Infanterie de Ligne) (Colonel Auguste Florimond dit Alexis Berthe)
- 3 Artillery Batteries (2 batteries de 4 and 1 de mitrailleuses) and 1 Engineer Company.

2nd Infantry Division

The 2nd infantry Division of the 5th Army Corps was under the orders of général de l'Abadie d'Aydren.

- 1st Brigade of général Lapasset
  - 84th Infantry Regiment (French: 84^{e} Régiment d'Infanterie de Ligne) (Colonel Claude Joseph Paul Benoit)
  - 97th Infantry Regiment (French: 97^{e} Régiment d'Infanterie de Ligne) (Colonel Louis Henri Eugène Copmartin)
  - 14e Bataillon de Chasseurs à Pied (French: 14^{e} Bataillon de Chasseurs à Pied) (Commandant Planck)
- 2nd Brigade of général de Maussion
  - 49th Infantry Regiment (French: 49^{e} Régiment d'Infanterie de Ligne) (colonel Kampf)
  - 88th Infantry Regiment (French: 88^{e} Régiment d'Infanterie de Ligne) (Colonel Henri Jean Courty )
- 2 Artillery Batteries (1 battery de 4 and 1 de mitrailleuses) and 1 Engineer Company.

3rd Infantry Division

The 3rd Infantry Division of the 5th Army Corps was under the orders of général Guyot de Lespart

- 1st Brigade of général Abatucci
  - 17th Infantry Regiment (French: 17^{e} Régiment d'Infanterie de Ligne) (colonel Weissemburger)
  - 27th Infantry Regiment (French: 27^{e} Régiment d'Infanterie de Ligne) (Colonel Ernest Ézéchiel Marie-Bon de Barolet)
  - 19e Bataillon de Chasseurs à Pied (French: 19^{e} Bataillon de Chasseurs à Pied) (Commandant Léon Michel Marie-Louis de Marqué)
- 2nd Brigade of général Louis de Fontanges de Couzan
  - 30th Infantry Regiment (French: 30e Régiment d'Infanterie de Ligne) (Colonel Jean Henri Wirbel)
  - 68th Infantry Regiment (French: 68^{e} Régiment d'Infanterie de Ligne) (Colonel François Justin Paturel)
- 3 Artillery Batteries (2 batteries de 4 and 1 de mitrailleuses) and 1 Engineer Company.

Cavalry Division

The Cavalry Division of the 5th Army Corps was commanded by général Brahaut

- 1st Brigade of général François Julien Raymond de Pierre de Bernis
  - 5th Hussards Regiment (French: 5^{e} Régiment de Hussards) (colonel victor Flogny)
  - 12e Régiment de Chasseurs à Cheval (French: 12^{e} régiment de chasseurs à cheval) (Colonel Louis Adrien de Tucé)
- 2nd Brigade of général Charles François Henri Simon de La Mortière
  - 3rd Regiment of Lancers (French: 3^{e} Régiment de Lanciers) (Colonel Gilles Joseph Thorel)
  - 5th Regiment of Lancers (French: 5^{e} Régiment de Lanciers) (Colonel Marie Paul Oscar de Boério)

Reserve Artillery

Colonel Adolphe Louis Émile Frédéric de Salignac-Fénelon

- 2 Artillery Batteries de 12,
- 2 Artillery Batteries de 4 mounted,
- 2 Artillery Batteries de 4 horse mounted.

=== 7th Army Corps ===
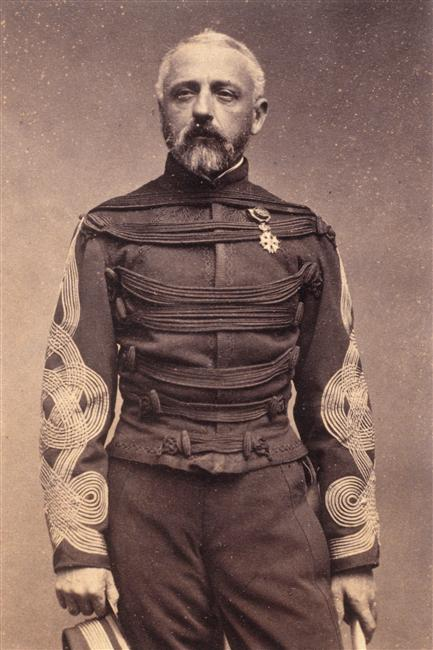
Général Douay, commander of the 7th Army Corps.

The 7th Army Corps (French: 7^{e} corps d'armée) was commanded by général Douay, with headquarter staff général Renson.

1st Infantry Division

The 1st Infantry Division of the 7th Army Corps was under the orders of général Conseil-Dumesnil

- 1st Brigade of général Nicolaï
  - 3rd Infantry Regiment (French: 3^{e} Régiment d'Infanterie de Ligne) (Colonel Champion)
  - 21st Infantry Regiment (French: 21^{e} Régiment d'Infanterie de Ligne) (Colonel Morand)
  - 17e Bataillon de Chasseurs à Pied (French: 17^{e} Bataillon de Chasseurs à Pied) (Commandant Merchier)
- 2nd Brigade of général Maire
  - 47th Infantry Regiment (French: 47^{e} Régiment d'Infanterie de Ligne) (Colonel de Gramont)
  - 99th Infantry Regiment (French: 99^{e} Régiment d'Infanterie de Ligne) (Colonel Chagrin de Saint-Hilaire)
- 3 Artillery Batteries (2 batteries de 4 and 1 de mitrailleuses) and 1 Engineer Company.

2nd Infantry Division

The 2nd Infantry Division of the 7th Army Corps was under the orders of général Liébert.

- 1st Brigade of général Guiomar
  - 5th Infantry Regiment (French: 5^{e} Régiment d'Infanterie de Ligne) (Colonel Boyer)
  - 37th Infantry Regiment (French: 37^{e} Régiment d'Infanterie de Ligne) (Colonel de Formy de la Blanchetée)
  - 6e Bataillon de Chasseurs à Pied (French: 6^{e} Bataillon de Chasseurs à Pied) (Commandant de Beaufort)
- 2nd Brigade of général de la Bastide
  - 53rd Infantry Regiment (French: 53^{e} Régiment d'Infanterie de Ligne) (Colonel Japy)
  - 89th Infantry Regiment (French: 89^{e} Régiment d'Infanterie de Ligne) (Colonel Munier)
- 3 Artillery Batteries (2 batteries de 4 and 1 de mitrailleuses) and 1 Engineer Company.

3rd Infantry Division

The 3rd Infantry Division of the 7th Army Corps was under the orders of général Dumont

- 1st Brigade of général Bordas
  - 52nd Infantry Regiment (French: 52^{e} Régiment d'Infanterie de Ligne) (Colonel Aveline)
  - 79th Infantry Regiment (French: 79^{e} Régiment d'Infanterie de Ligne) (Colonel Bressolles)
- 2nd Brigade of général Bittard des Portes
  - 82nd Infantry Regiment (French: 82^{e} Régiment d'Infanterie de Ligne) (Colonel Guys)
  - 83rd Infantry Regiment (French: 83^{e} Régiment d'Infanterie de Ligne) (Colonel Séatelli)
- 3 Artillery Batteries (2 batteries de 4 and 1 de mitrailleuses) and 1 Engineer Company.

Cavalry Division

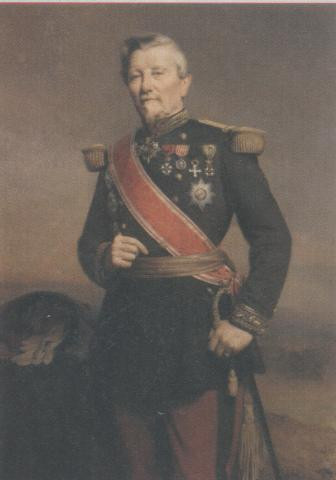
Général Ameil, commander of the cavalry division of the 7th Army Corps.

The Cavalry Division of the 7th Army Corps was commanded by général baron Ameil

- 1st Brigade of général Cambriel
  - 4th Hussards Regiment (French: 4^{e} Régiment de Hussards) (Colonel de Lavigerie)
  - 4th Regiment of Lancers (French: 4^{e} Régiment de Lanciers) (Colonel Féline)
  - 8th Regiment of Lancers (French: 8^{e} Régiment de Lanciers) (Colonel de Dampierre)
- 2nd Brigade of général Jolif-Ducoulombier
  - 6th Hussards Regiment (French: 6^{e} Régiment de Hussards) (Colonel Guillon)
  - 6th Dragoon Regiment (French: 6^{e} Régiment de Dragons) (Colonel Tillion)

Reserve Artillery

Colonel Aubac

- 2 Artillery Batteries de 12,
- 2 Artillery Batteries de 4 mounted,
- 2 Artillery Batteries de 4 horse mounted.

=== 12th Army Corps ===
The 12th Army Corps (French: 12^{e} corps d'armée) was commanded by général Lebrun, with headquarter staff général Gresley.

1st Infantry Division

The 1st Infantry Division of the 12th Army Corps was under the orders of général Grandchamp.

- 1st Brigade of général Cambriels
  - 2nd Marching Chasseurs Companies (captain Fayes)
  - 22nd Infantry Regiment (French: 22^{e} Régiment d'Infanterie de Ligne) (Colonel de Villeneuve)
  - 34th Infantry Regiment (French: 34^{e} Régiment d'Infanterie de Ligne) (Colonel Hervé)
- 2nd Brigade of général de Villeneuve
  - 58th Infantry Regiment (French: 58^{e} Régiment d'Infanterie de Ligne) (Colonel Dulyon de Rochefort)
  - 79th Infantry Regiment (French: 79^{e} Régiment d'Infanterie de Ligne) (Colonel Bressolles)
- 3 Artillery Batteries (2 batteries de 4 and 1 de mitrailleuses) and 1 Engineer Company.

2nd Infantry Division

The 2nd Infantry Division of the 12th Army Corps was under the orders of général Lagretelle.

- 1st Brigade of général Marquisan
  - 2 Marching Chasseurs Company
  - 3rd Marching Regiment (lieutenant-colonel Bernier)
  - 4th Marching Regiment (lieutenant-Chauchard)
- 2nd Brigade of général Louvent
  - 14th Infantry Regiment (French: 14^{e} Régiment d'Infanterie de Ligne) (Colonel Doussot)
  - 20th Infantry Regiment (French: 20^{e} Régiment d'Infanterie de Ligne) (Colonel de la Guigneraye)
  - 31st Infantry Regiment (French: 31^{e} Régiment d'Infanterie de Ligne) (Colonel Sautereau)
- 5 Artillery Batteries ( 3 batteries de 4, 1 de 12 and 1 de mitrailleuses) and 1 Engineer Company

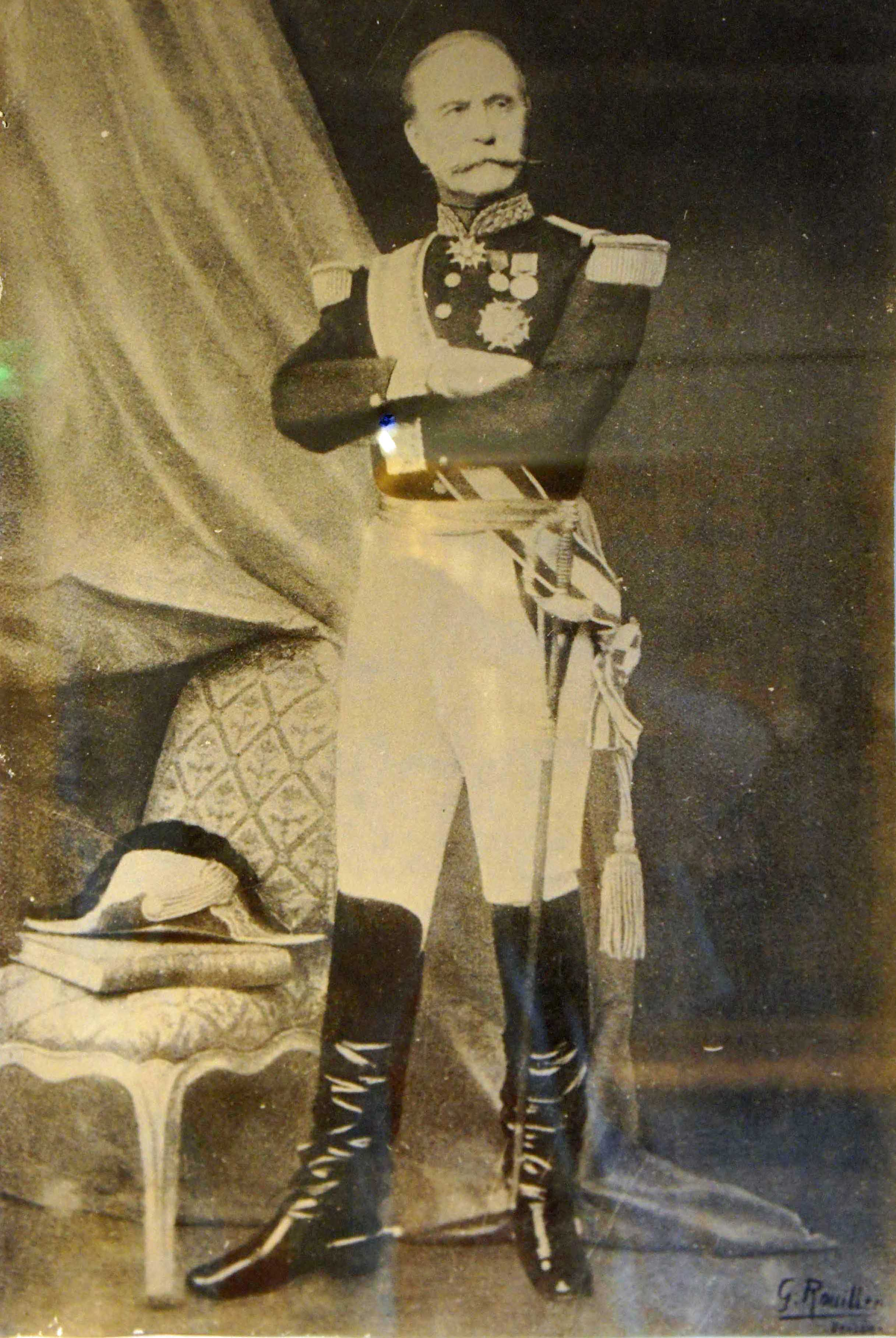
Général de Vassoigne, commander of the 3rd Infantry Division of the 12th Army Corps.

3rd Infantry Division

The 3rd Infantry Division of the 12th Army Corps was under the orders of général de Vassoigne.

- 1st Brigade of général Reboul
  - 1st Marching Marine Infantry Regiment (Colonel Brière de l'Isle)
  - 3rd Marching Marine Infantry Regiment (Colonel D'arbaud)
- 2nd Brigade of général Martin des Pallières
  - 2nd Marching Marine Infantry Regiment (Colonel Alleyron)
  - 3rd Marching Marine Infantry Regiment (Colonel Lecamus)
- 9 Artillery Batteries (8 batteries de 4 and 1 de mitrailleuses) and 1 Engineer Company

Cavalry Division

The Cavalry Division of the 12th Army Corps was commanded by général Lichtlin

- 1st Brigade of général de Vendoeuvre
  - 7e Régiment de Chasseurs à Cheval (French: 7^{e} Régiment de Chasseurs à Cheval) (Colonel Thornton)
  - 8e Régiment de Chasseurs à Cheval (French: 8^{e} Régiment de Chasseurs à Cheval) (Colonel Jamin du Fresnay)
- 2nd Brigade of général de Béville
  - 5th Cuirassiers Regiment (French: 5^{e} Régiment de Cuirassiers) (Colonel de Coutenson)
  - 6th Cuirassiers Regiment (French: 6^{e} Régiment de Cuirassiers) (Colonel Martin)

Cavalry Division of the 6th Corps

The Cavalry Division of the 6th Army Corps was commanded by général de Salignac-Fénelon'

- 1st Brigade of général Tillard
  - 6e Régiment de Chasseurs à Cheval (French: 6^{e} Régiment de Chasseurs à Cheval) (Colonel Bonvoust)
  - 1st Hussard Regiment (French: 1^{er} Régiment de Hussards) (Colonel de Beauffremont)
- 2nd Brigade of général Savaresse
  - 14th Dragoon Regiment (French: 14^{e} Régiment de Dragons) (Colonel Oudinot de Reggio)
  - 14e Régiment de Chasseurs à Cheval (French: 14^{e} Régiment de Chasseurs à Cheval) (Colonel Perrier)

Reserve Artillery

- Artillery Reserve was under the orders of général Bertrand
  - 8 Artillery Batteries de 4 montées
  - 2 Artillery Batteries de 12 montées
  - 2 Artillery Batteries de 4 (marine artillery)
  - 1 Artillery Battery de mitrailleuses (marine artillery) and 3 Engineer Companies

=== Reserve and Cavalry ===
1st Cavalry Division

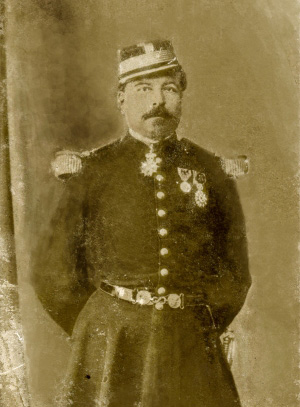
Général Margueritte, commander of the 1st Cavalry Reserve Division.

The 1st Reserve Cavalry Division was commanded by général Margueritte

- 1st Brigade
  - 1st African Chasseurs Regiment (French: 1^{er} Régiment de Chasseurs d’Afrique) (Colonel Clicquot)
  - 3rd African Chasseurs Regiment (French: 3^{e} Régiment de Chasseurs d’Afrique) (Colonel de Galliffet)
- 2nd Brigade of général Tillard
  - 6e Régiment de Chasseurs à Cheval(French: 6^{e} Régiment de Chasseurs à Cheval) (Colonel Bonvoust)
  - 1^{er} Régiment de Hussards (French: 1^{er} Régiment de Hussards) (Colonel de Beauffremont)
- 2 Artillery Batteries horse mounted

2nd Cavalry Division

The 2nd Reserve Cavalry Division was commanded by général de Bonnemain

- 1st Brigade of général Girard
  - 1st Cuirassiers Regiment (French: 1^{er} Régiment de Cuirassiers) (Colonel de Vendoeuvre)
  - 4th Cuirassiers Regiment (French: 4^{e} Régiment de Cuirassiers) (Colonel Courtois)
- 2nd Brigade of général de Brauer
  - 2nd Cuirassiers Regiment (French: 2^{e} Régiment de Cuirassiers) (Colonel Boréverrier)
  - 3rd Cuirassiers Regiment (French: 3^{e} Régiment de Cuirassiers) (Colonel Despetit de Lassalle)
- 1 Artillery Battery horse mounted

== Sources and bibliography ==
- Lieutenant-colonel Rousset, Histoire générale de la guerre franco allemande - 1870-1871, éditions Montgredien et Cie, 1900.
- Histoire de la guerre de 1870-71, Éditions G. Chamerot, 1903.
- Général Niox, La guerre de 1870 - Simple récit, Librairie Ch. Delagrave, 1898.
- Annuaire militaire de l'empire français 1870
- Howard, Michael, The Franco-Prussian War: The German Invasion of France 1870–1871, New York: Routledge, 2001. ISBN 0-415-26671-8.
