= 2nd Guards Infantry Division (German Empire) =

- 2. Garde-Infanterie-Division
- Active: 5 September 1818 – 30 April 1919
- Country: Kingdom of Prussia; German Empire
- Branch: Prussian Army; Imperial German Army
- Type: Infantry
- Size: Division
- Part of: Guards Corps
- Garrison/HQ: Berlin
- Engagements: Austro-Prussian War; Franco-Prussian War; World War I

Commanders
- Notable commanders: Arnold von Winckler; Walther von Lüttwitz; Maximilian Ritter von Höhn

The 2nd Guards Infantry Division (German: 2. Garde-Infanterie-Division) was a unit in the Guards Corps of the Imperial German Army during the First World War. At the outbreak of war it was commanded by Lieutenant General Arnold von Winckler.

== Origins ==
The division was originally established on August 11, 1813 as a grenadier brigade of four battalions. On September 5, 1818, the brigade was expanded into the 2nd Division of the Guard and Grenadier Corps and was finally given the name 2nd Guard Division on December 22, 1819.

== Franco-Prussian War ==
In the Franco-Prussian War, the division fought in the battles of Gravelotte and Sedan and was part of the siege of Paris. Here it took part in the Battle of Le Bourget.

== Imperial German Army ==
Order of battle: 1914

- 3rd Guards Infantry Brigade
  - 1st (Emperor Alexander) Guards Grenadiers
  - 3rd (Queen Elisabeth) Guards Grenadiers
  - Guards Schützen Battalion
- 4th Guards Infantry Brigade
  - 2nd (Emperor Francis) Guards Grenadiers
  - 4th (Queen Augusta) Guards Grenadiers
- 2nd Guards Field Artillery Brigade
  - 2nd Guards Field Artillery Regiment
  - 4th Guards Field Artillery Regiment
- 2nd Guards Uhlans (1st, 3rd, 4th and 5th Squadrons)
- 2nd and 3rd Companies, Guards Pioneer Battalion
- 2nd Section, Guards Field Ambulance Company
