= 2nd Royal Bavarian Division =

2nd Royal Bavarian Division (2. Königlich Bayerische Division); from August 2, 1914, 2nd Bavarian Infantry Division (2. Bayerische Infanterie-Division)
- Active: 1815–1919
- Country: Bavaria, German Empire
- Branch: Army
- Type: Infantry (in peacetime included cavalry)
- Size: Approximately 18,000 (on mobilisation in 1914)
- Part of: I Royal Bavarian Corps (I. Kgl. Bayer. Armeekorps)
- Garrison/HQ: Augsburg
- Engagements: Austro-Prussian War Franco-Prussian War: Beaumont; Sedan; 1st and 2nd Orleans; Loigny-Poupry; Beaugency-Cravant; Paris; World War I: Battle of the Frontiers; Race to the Sea; Battle of Verdun; Battle of the Somme; Second Battle of the Aisne; German spring offensive; First Battle of the Somme (1918); Second Battle of the Marne

The 2nd Royal Bavarian Division was a unit of the Royal Bavarian Army which served alongside the Prussian Army as part of the Imperial German Army. The division was formed on November 27, 1815, as the Infantry Division of the Munich General Command (Infanterie-Division des Generalkommandos München.). It was called the 2nd Army Division between 1822 and 1848, again between 1851 and 1859, and again from 1869 to 1872. It was called the 2nd Infantry Division from 1848 to 1851 (as well as during wartime) and was named the Augsburg General Command from 1859 to 1869. From April 1, 1872, until mobilization for World War I, it was the 2nd Division. In Bavarian sources, it was not generally referred to as a "Royal Bavarian" division, as this was considered self-evident, but outside Bavaria, this designation was used for it, and other Bavarian units, to distinguish them from similarly numbered Prussian units. The division was headquartered in Ingolstadt from 1815 to 1817, in Regensburg from 1817 to 1822, and in Augsburg from 1822 to 1919, except for the period 1871-1873, when it was part of the German occupation forces in France. The division was part of the I Royal Bavarian Army Corps.

== Combat chronicle ==
The division fought against Prussia in the Austro-Prussian War of 1866, seeing action at Kissingen, Helmstadt and Roßbrunn. In the Franco-Prussian War of 1870-71, the division fought alongside the Prussians. It saw action in battles of Beaumont and Sedan, the 1st and 2nd battles of Orleans, the battles of Loigny-Poupry and Beaugency-Cravant, and the siege of Paris.

During World War I, the division served on the Western Front. It fought in the Battle of the Frontiers against French forces in the early stages, and then participated in the Race to the Sea, fighting along the Somme. It remained in the trenchlines on the Somme until October 1915, and then went into the line in Flanders and the Artois until May 1916. In May 1916, the division went into the Battle of Verdun. After Verdun, it fought in the later stages of the Battle of the Somme. In May 1917, it fought in the Second Battle of the Aisne, also called the Third Battle of Champagne (and by the Germans, the Double Battle on the Aisne and in the Champagne). After a period in the reserve and in the trenchlines, it resisted the late 1917 French offensive at Verdun. In 1918, the division participated in the German spring offensive, fighting in the First Battle of the Somme (1918), also known as the Second Battle of the Somme (to distinguish it from the 1916 battle). It fought in the Second Battle of the Marne, both in the initial German offensive and the Allied counteroffensive. Thereafter, it resisted various Allied attacks until the end of the war. Allied intelligence rated the division as one of the very best German shock divisions.

== Pre-World War I peacetime organization ==
In 1914, the peacetime organization of the 2nd Royal Bavarian Division was as follows:

- 3. bayerische Infanterie-Brigade
  - Kgl. Bayerisches 3. Infanterie-Regiment Prinz Karl von Bayern
  - Kgl. Bayerisches 20. Infanterie-Regiment Prinz Franz
- 4. bayerische Infanterie-Brigade
  - Kgl. Bayerisches 12. Infanterie-Regiment Prinz Arnulf
  - Kgl. Bayerisches 15. Infanterie-Regiment König Friedrich August von Sachsen
- 2. bayerische Kavallerie-Brigade
  - Kgl. Bayerisches 4. Chevaulegers-Regiment König
  - Kgl. Bayerisches 8. Chevaulegers-Regiment
- 2. bayerische Feldartillerie-Brigade
  - Kgl. Bayerisches 4. Feldartillerie-Regiment König
  - Kgl. Bayerisches 9. Feldartillerie-Regiment

== Order of battle on mobilization ==
On mobilization in August 1914 at the beginning of World War I, most divisional cavalry, including brigade headquarters, was withdrawn to form cavalry divisions or split up among divisions as reconnaissance units. Divisions received engineer companies and other support units from their higher headquarters. The 2nd Bavarian Division was renamed the 2nd Bavarian Infantry Division. Its initial wartime organization (major units) was as follows:

- 3. bayerische Infanterie-Brigade
  - Kgl. Bayerisches 3. Infanterie-Regiment Prinz Karl von Bayern
  - Kgl. Bayerisches 20. Infanterie-Regiment Prinz Franz
- 4. bayerische Infanterie-Brigade
  - Kgl. Bayerisches 12. Infanterie-Regiment Prinz Arnulf
  - Kgl. Bayerisches 15. Infanterie-Regiment König Friedrich August von Sachsen
- Kgl. Bayerisches 4. Chevaulegers-Regiment König
- 2. bayerische Feldartillerie-Brigade
  - Kgl. Bayerisches 4. Feldartillerie-Regiment König
  - Kgl. Bayerisches 9. Feldartillerie-Regiment
- 2.Kompanie/Kgl. Bayerisches 1. Pionier-Bataillon

== Late World War I organization ==
Divisions underwent many changes during the war, with regiments moving from division to division, and some being destroyed and rebuilt. During the war, most divisions became triangular - one infantry brigade with three infantry regiments rather than two infantry brigades of two regiments (a "square division"). The 2nd Bavarian Infantry Division was triangularized in April 1915, sending the 3rd Bavarian Infantry Regiment to the newly formed 11th Bavarian Infantry Division. An artillery commander replaced the artillery brigade headquarters, the cavalry was further reduced, and the engineer contingent was increased. Divisional signals commanders were established to better control communications, a major problem in coordinating infantry and artillery operations during World War I. The division's order of battle on April 9, 1918, was as follows:

- 4. bayerische Infanterie-Brigade
  - Kgl. Bayerisches 12. Infanterie-Regiment Prinz Arnulf
  - Kgl. Bayerisches 15. Infanterie-Regiment König Friedrich August von Sachsen
  - Kgl. Bayerisches 20. Infanterie-Regiment Prinz Franz
  - Kgl. Bayerische Maschinengewehr-Scharfschützen-Abteilung Nr. 2
- 3.Eskadron/Kgl. Bayerisches 8. Chevaulegers-Regiment
- Kgl. Bayerischer Artillerie-Kommandeur 2
  - Kgl. Bayerisches 9. Feldartillerie-Regiment
  - I. Bataillon/Kgl. Bayerisches Reserve-Fußartillerie-Regiment Nr. 3
- Kgl. Bayerisches Pionier-Bataillon Nr. 7
  - Kgl. Bayerische Pionier-Kompanie Nr. 2
  - Kgl. Bayerische Pionier-Kompanie Nr. 4
  - Kgl. Bayerische Minenwerfer-Kompanie Nr. 2
- Kgl. Bayerischer Divisions-Nachrichten-Kommandeur 2
