= Battle of Buzancy =

Coordinates: 49.426°N 4.955°E

- Part of Franco-Prussian War
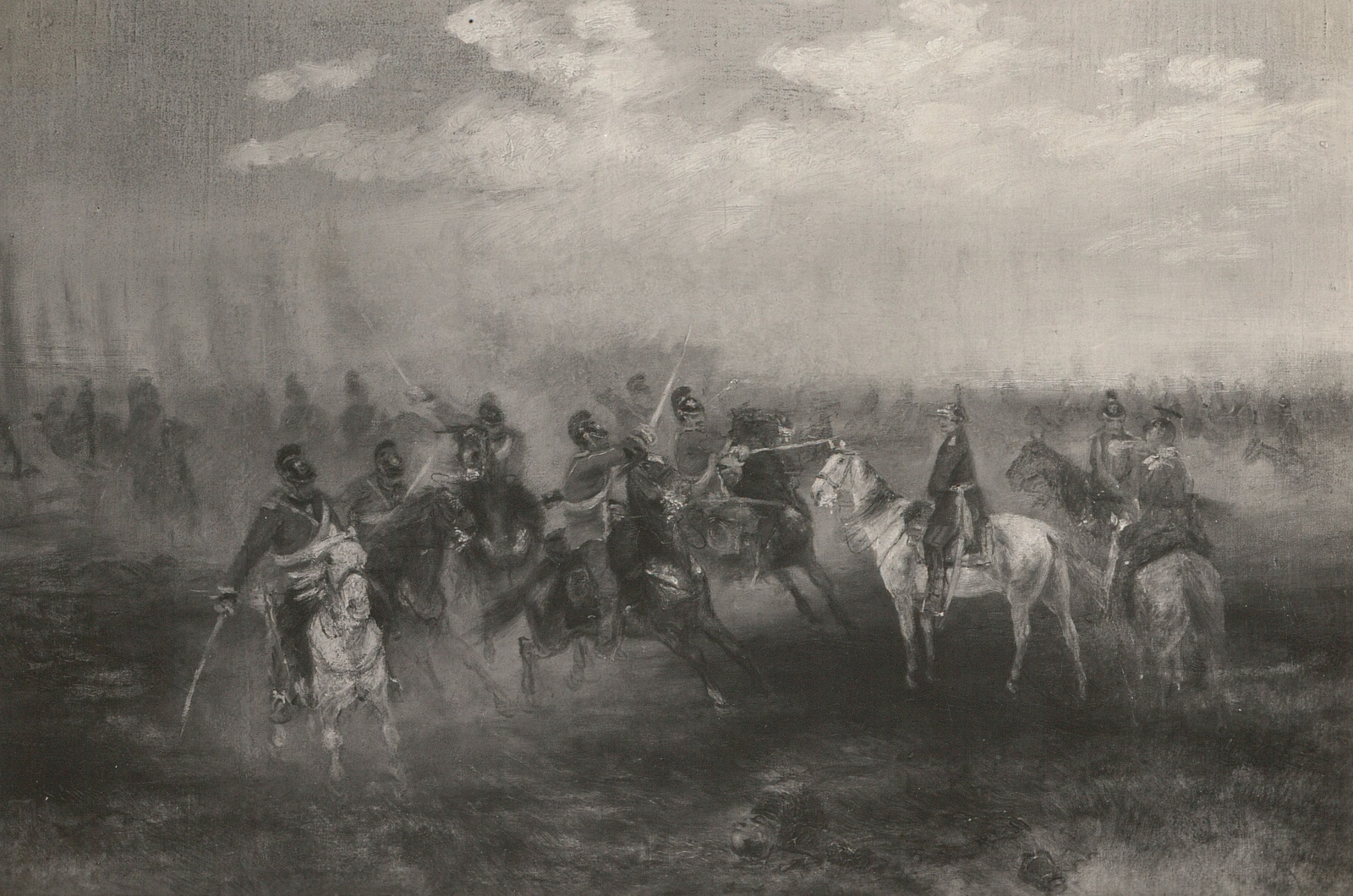
- Battle of Buzancy (painting by Fritz von Uhde, c. 1895)
Date	27 August 1870
Location	Buzancy, Ardennes, France
Result	German Victory, French army stationed wiped out.

Belligerents
French Empire	North German Confederation: Prussia; Saxony

Commanders and leaders
Patrice de MacMahon; Pierre Louis Charles de Failly	Friedrich Senfft von Pilsach

Units involved
V Army	XVII Corps

Strength
Regiment Chasseur 12 of Corps No. 5	3rd Cavalry Regiment ( Saxony ), a cavalry squadron of the 18th Uhlan Regiment and the Zwinker battery

Casualties and losses
Unknown killed and wounded, 12 cavalrymen and Major de la Porte captured	Unknown killed, 32 soldiers and 27 warhorses wounded; 2 captains wounded

Battle of Buzancy was a battle of the Franco-Prussian War which took place on 27 August 1870 in Buzancy, France between the French Empire and the combined German forces of Prussia and Saxony. The midfield force of the 24th Brigade (under the command of Major General Friedrich Senfft von Pilsach ) of a division Saxon cavalry of the Maas Army of the Prussian army won a victory over the Cavalry Regiment. 12th Chasseur light infantry of the V Army of the French Empire under the command of General Pierre Louis Charles de Failly. Taken by surprise in this cavalry battle, the French formation was torn apart and almost completely annihilated. On the Prussian - German side, the captains of the two cavalry squadrons involved in the battle were wounded. The defeat at Buzancy forced the retreat of the French cavalry squadrons, and the Battle of Buzancy is arguably the most characteristic cavalry and artillery clash of the war.

== Background ==
With fierce battles at Gravelotte on 18 October month 8 year 1870, the French forces of Marshal led by François Achille Bazaine has been pushed back to Metz. Received orders from the Paris, Marshal Patrice de Mac-Mahon, together with the Emperor Napoleon III of France, marched from Châlons via Reims and Rethel to the north, to proceed to Metz to rescue Bazaine which was falling under the siege of the Prussian army. Meanwhile, on 23 August, German armies began their march down Châlons. Despite this, on 24 August, the Army Headquarters of the Army, commanded by Prince Friedrich Wilhelm at Ligny, received word of the emptiness of the French barracks at Châlons, and by 25 August the situation remained. The picture clearly shows that MacMahon is bringing troops to rescue Bazaine. On 26 August 1870 Army Maas had discovered MacMahon's troops, and therefore all German armies were ordered to advance north with Army Maas on the left flank of the formation.

== Battle ==
On the morning of 27 August the Saxony Cavalry Division – the supporting force of The XVII Corps, responsible for crossing the Meuse at Dun, convened its 24th Brigade at Landres. This cavalry brigade conducted a reconnaissance in a northwest direction towards Youziers and Buzancy, and the midfield force of the 3rd Cavalry Regiment and a battery of the German cavalry batteries, after reaching Remonville, went to Buzancy and discovered the 12th Chasseur Cavalry Regiment in the town. After the reconnaissance was completed, Von Pilsach realized that the French army was weak, so he ordered the midfielders to attack the enemy. The French cavalry was smashed and had to retreat to Buzancy. Despite fierce French resistance, the Germans were able to overrun the town. A fierce hand-to-hand battle broke out, and the larger French forces drove the Germans out of Buzancy. Even so, Captain Von Woldersdorf – the captain of the 1st cavalry division – which had already occupied a position east of Remonville – was correctly aware of the situation. He led his troops straight into a favorable position, and the game turned exactly as he predicted: his attack on the left flank of the French cavalry allowed the Germans to regroup, and the French cavalry - attacked from the front and flanks - was once again driven back into the town.

However, French carbines prevented the advance of the Saxons into the village, causing heavy damage to the Germans. The offensive position belonged to the French cavalry, and in this situation the German cavalry batteries opened fire strongly on the enemy which decided the battle to which the French were forced to flee in a frenzy.

== Aftermath ==
The Battle of Buzancy demonstrated the failure of Mac-Mahon, and the Saxon Cavalry Division resumed its reconnaissance mission. On 30 August 1870 the main forces of the two sides clashed at the Battle of Beaumont. This was again a decisive defeat of the French army before the enemy army. The Battle of Buzancy demonstrated the effectiveness of cavalry artillery in combat. Although the French had the numerical advantage, the lack of artillery led to their defeat.
