= Maximilian Ritter von Höhn =

Maximilian Ritter von Höhn (16 August 1859 - 26 April 1936) was a general Royal Bavarian Army during World War I.

== Biography ==
He was born on 16 August 1859 in Kitzingen. He served in World War I and was promoted to General der Artillerie in 1916. After the war, in 1919, he was given command of the I Royal Bavarian Corps and retired. He died on 26 April 1936 in Munich.
