= I Royal Bavarian Corps =

Military unit

I Royal Bavarian Army Corps I. Königlich Bayerische Armee-Korps
- Flag of the Staff of a Generalkommando (1871–1918)
- Active: 1869–1919
- Country: Kingdom of Bavaria; German Empire
- Type: Corps
- Size: Approximately 44,000 (on mobilisation in 1914)
- Garrison/HQ: Munich/Herzog-Max-Burg Pfandhausstraße 2
- Patron: King of Bavaria
- Engagements: Franco-Prussian War Battle of Worth (1870) Battle of Beaumont Battle of Bazeilles Battle of Sedan (1870) Loire Campaign World War I Battle of the Frontiers Race to the Sea Battle of Verdun Battle of the Somme

Insignia
- Abbreviation: I Bavarian AK

The I Royal Bavarian Army Corps / I Bavarian AK (German: I. Königlich Bayerisches Armee-Korps) was a corps level command of the Royal Bavarian Army, part of the Imperial German Army, before and during World War I. (Note: From the late 1800s, the Prussian Army was effectively the German Army as, during the period of German unification (1866-1871), the states of the German Empire entered into conventions with Prussia regarding their armies. Only the Bavarian Army remained fully autonomous and came under Prussian control only during wartime.)

As part of the 1868 army reform, the I Royal Bavarian Army Corps of the Bavarian Army was set up in 1869 in Munich as the Generalkommando (headquarters) for the southern part of the kingdom. With the formation of the III Royal Bavarian Corps in 1900, it was made responsible for Swabia and most of Upper and Lower Bavaria. Like all Bavarian formations, it was assigned to the IV Army Inspectorate. This became the 6th Army at the start of the First World War. The Corps was disbanded at the end of the war along with the Kingdom of Bavaria.

== Franco-Prussian War ==
The I Royal Bavarian Corps (along with the II Royal Bavarian Corps) participated in the Franco-Prussian War as part of the 3rd Army.

It initially fought in the battles of Worth, Beaumont and Bazeilles, where it lost about 7,000 men, it also fought at the decisive battle of Sedan. After Sedan, the Corps was responsible for the removal of prisoners and ensuring transport of the booty. Thereafter, it moved south of Paris to the Loire, to shield the army during the Siege of Paris. A newly formed French Corps gathered in the Orléans area, so the Corps was reinforced by the 17th Division, 22nd Division and two cavalry divisions. After the Battle of Artenay, Orléans was captured and the reinforcing divisions were removed so the Corps did not have them for the first battles against the Army of the Loire. As a result of the subsequent Battle of Coulmiers, Orléans was lost once again.

In the period from October to late December 1870, the Corps was on service without interruption, particularly from the beginning of November in the battles of Villepion, Loigny, Orléans and Beaugency, usually against a numerically superior enemy. The losses in December alone amounted to 5,600 men. A planned return to the siege army at Paris had to be postponed several times because the Bavarians could not be spared.

== Peacetime organisation ==
The 25 peacetime Corps of the German Army (Guards, I - XXI, I - III Bavarian) had a reasonably standardised organisation. Each consisted of two divisions with usually two infantry brigades, one field artillery brigade and a cavalry brigade each. Each brigade normally consisted of two regiments of the appropriate type, so each Corps normally commanded 8 infantry, 4 field artillery and 4 cavalry regiments. There were exceptions to this rule:

V, VI, VII, IX and XIV Corps each had a 5th infantry brigade (so 10 infantry regiments)
II, XIII, XVIII and XXI Corps had a 9th infantry regiment
I, VI and XVI Corps had a 3rd cavalry brigade (so 6 cavalry regiments)
the Guards Corps had 11 infantry regiments (in 5 brigades) and 8 cavalry regiments (in 4 brigades).

Each Corps also directly controlled a number of other units. This could include one or more

Foot Artillery Regiment
Jäger Battalion
Pioneer Battalion
Train Battalion

Peacetime organization of the Corps
Corps	Division	Brigade	Units	Garrison
I Royal Bavarian Corps	1st Royal Bavarian Division	1st Bavarian Infantry Brigade	Royal Bavarian Infantry Lifeguards Regiment	Munich
I Royal Bavarian Corps	1st Royal Bavarian Division	1st Bavarian Infantry Brigade	1st Royal Bavarian Infantry "King"	Munich
I Royal Bavarian Corps	1st Royal Bavarian Division	2nd Bavarian Infantry Brigade	2nd Royal Bavarian Infantry "Crown Prince"	Munich
I Royal Bavarian Corps	1st Royal Bavarian Division	2nd Bavarian Infantry Brigade	16th Royal Bavarian Infantry "Grand Duke Ferdinand of Tuscany"	Passau, Landshut
I Royal Bavarian Corps	1st Royal Bavarian Division	1st Bavarian Field Artillery Brigade	1st Royal Bavarian Field Artillery "Prince Regent Luitpold"	Munich
I Royal Bavarian Corps	1st Royal Bavarian Division	1st Bavarian Field Artillery Brigade	7th Royal Bavarian Field Artillery "Prince Regent Luitpold"	Munich
I Royal Bavarian Corps	1st Royal Bavarian Division	1st Bavarian Cavalry Brigade	1st Royal Bavarian Heavy Cavalry "Prince Charles of Bavaria"	Munich
I Royal Bavarian Corps	1st Royal Bavarian Division	1st Bavarian Cavalry Brigade	2nd Royal Bavarian Heavy Cavalry "Archduke Francis Ferdinand of Austria"	Landshut
I Royal Bavarian Corps	2nd Royal Bavarian Division	3rd Bavarian Infantry Brigade	3rd Royal Bavarian Infantry "Prince Charles of Bavaria"	Augsburg
I Royal Bavarian Corps	2nd Royal Bavarian Division	3rd Bavarian Infantry Brigade	20th Royal Bavarian Infantry "Prince Francis"	Lindau, Kempten
I Royal Bavarian Corps	2nd Royal Bavarian Division	4th Bavarian Infantry Brigade	12th Royal Bavarian Infantry "Prince Arnulf"	Neu-Ulm
I Royal Bavarian Corps	2nd Royal Bavarian Division	4th Bavarian Infantry Brigade	15th Royal Bavarian Infantry "King Frederick August of Saxony"	Neuburg an der Donau
I Royal Bavarian Corps	2nd Royal Bavarian Division	2nd Bavarian Field Artillery Brigade	4th Royal Bavarian Field Artillery "King"	Augsburg
I Royal Bavarian Corps	2nd Royal Bavarian Division	2nd Bavarian Field Artillery Brigade	9th Royal Bavarian Field Artillery	Freising
I Royal Bavarian Corps	2nd Royal Bavarian Division	2nd Bavarian Cavalry Brigade	4th Royal Bavarian Chevau-légers "King"	Augsburg, Neu-Ulm
I Royal Bavarian Corps	2nd Royal Bavarian Division	2nd Bavarian Cavalry Brigade	8th Royal Bavarian Chevau-légers	Dillingen
I Royal Bavarian Corps	Corps Troops		1st Royal Bavarian Jäger Battalion	Freising
I Royal Bavarian Corps	Corps Troops		1st Royal Bavarian Foot Artillery "vakant Bothmer"	Munich, Neu-Ulm
I Royal Bavarian Corps	Corps Troops		1st Royal Bavarian Pioneer Battalion	Munich
I Royal Bavarian Corps	Corps Troops		Royal Bavarian Railway Battalion	Munich
I Royal Bavarian Corps	Corps Troops		1st Royal Bavarian Telegraph Battalion	Munich
I Royal Bavarian Corps	Corps Troops		2nd Royal Bavarian Telegraph Battalion	Augsburg
I Royal Bavarian Corps	Corps Troops		1st Royal Bavarian Luft- u. Kraftfahrer Battalion	Munich
I Royal Bavarian Corps	Corps Troops		1st Royal Bavarian Flieger Battalion	Oberschleißheim
I Royal Bavarian Corps	Corps Troops		1st Royal Bavarian Train Abteilung	Munich
I Royal Bavarian Corps	Munich Defence Command (Landwehr-Inspektion)			Munich

== World War I ==
=== Organisation on mobilisation ===
On mobilization, on 2 August 1914, the Corps was restructured. 1st Cavalry Brigade was withdrawn to form part of the Bavarian Cavalry Division and the 2nd Cavalry Brigade was broken up and its regiments assigned to the divisions as reconnaissance units. Divisions received engineer companies and other support units from the Corps headquarters. In summary, I Bavarian Corps mobilised with 25 infantry battalions, 8 machine gun companies (48 machine guns), 8 cavalry squadrons, 24 field artillery batteries (144 guns), 4 heavy artillery batteries (16 guns), 3 pioneer companies and an aviation detachment.

Initial wartime organization of the Corps
Corps	Division	Brigade	Units
I Royal Bavarian Corps	1st Royal Bavarian Division	1st Bavarian Infantry Brigade	Bavarian Leib Infantry Regiment
I Royal Bavarian Corps	1st Royal Bavarian Division	1st Bavarian Infantry Brigade	1st Bavarian Infantry Regiment
I Royal Bavarian Corps	1st Royal Bavarian Division	2nd Bavarian Infantry Brigade	2nd Bavarian Infantry Regiment
I Royal Bavarian Corps	1st Royal Bavarian Division	2nd Bavarian Infantry Brigade	16th Bavarian Infantry Regiment
I Royal Bavarian Corps	1st Royal Bavarian Division	2nd Bavarian Infantry Brigade	1st Bavarian Jäger Battalion
I Royal Bavarian Corps	1st Royal Bavarian Division	1st Bavarian Field Artillery Brigade	1st Bavarian Field Artillery Regiment
I Royal Bavarian Corps	1st Royal Bavarian Division	1st Bavarian Field Artillery Brigade	7th Bavarian Field Artillery Regiment
I Royal Bavarian Corps	1st Royal Bavarian Division		8th Chevauleger Regiment
I Royal Bavarian Corps	1st Royal Bavarian Division		1st Company, 1st Bavarian Pioneer Battalion
I Royal Bavarian Corps	1st Royal Bavarian Division		3rd Company, 1st Bavarian Pioneer Battalion
I Royal Bavarian Corps	1st Royal Bavarian Division		1st Bavarian Divisional Pontoon Train
I Royal Bavarian Corps	1st Royal Bavarian Division		1st Bavarian Medical Company
I Royal Bavarian Corps	1st Royal Bavarian Division		3rd Bavarian Medical Company
I Royal Bavarian Corps	2nd Royal Bavarian Division	3rd Bavarian Infantry Brigade	3rd Bavarian Infantry Regiment
I Royal Bavarian Corps	2nd Royal Bavarian Division	3rd Bavarian Infantry Brigade	20th Bavarian Infantry Regiment
I Royal Bavarian Corps	2nd Royal Bavarian Division	4th Bavarian Infantry Brigade	12th Bavarian Reserve Infantry Regiment
I Royal Bavarian Corps	2nd Royal Bavarian Division	4th Bavarian Infantry Brigade	15th Bavarian Reserve Infantry Regiment
I Royal Bavarian Corps	2nd Royal Bavarian Division	2nd Bavarian Field Artillery Brigade	4th Bavarian Field Artillery Regiment
I Royal Bavarian Corps	2nd Royal Bavarian Division	2nd Bavarian Field Artillery Brigade	9th Bavarian Field Artillery Regiment
I Royal Bavarian Corps	2nd Royal Bavarian Division		4th Chevauleger Regiment
I Royal Bavarian Corps	2nd Royal Bavarian Division		2nd Company, 1st Bavarian Pioneer Battalion
I Royal Bavarian Corps	2nd Royal Bavarian Division		2nd Bavarian Divisional Pontoon Train
I Royal Bavarian Corps	2nd Royal Bavarian Division		2nd Bavarian Medical Company
I Royal Bavarian Corps	Corps Troops		II Battalion, 1st Bavarian Foot Artillery Regiment
I Royal Bavarian Corps	Corps Troops		1st Bavarian Aviation Detachment
I Royal Bavarian Corps	Corps Troops		1st Bavarian Corps Pontoon Train
I Royal Bavarian Corps	Corps Troops		1st Bavarian Telephone Detachment
I Royal Bavarian Corps	Corps Troops		1st Bavarian Pioneer Searchlight Section
I Royal Bavarian Corps	Corps Troops		Munition Trains and Columns corresponding to II Corps

=== Combat chronicle ===
On mobilisation, I Royal Bavarian Corps was assigned to the predominantly Bavarian 6th Army forming part of the left wing of the forces for the Schlieffen Plan offensive in August 1914. It was still in existence at the end of the war in the 18th Army, Heeresgruppe Deutscher Kronprinz on the Western Front.

== Commanders ==
The I Royal Bavarian Corps had the following commanders during its existence:

Dates	Rank	Name
8 January 1869	General der Infanterie	Ludwig Freiherr von und zu der Tann-Rathsamhausen
16 June 1881	General der Infanterie	Karl Freiherr von Horn
3 March 1887	Generalleutnant	Prince Leopold of Bavaria
29 October 1890	Generaloberst	Prince Arnulf of Bavaria
19 April 1906	General der Infanterie	Rupprecht, Crown Prince of Bavaria
22 March 1913	General der Infanterie	Oskar Ritter von Xylander
19 June 1918	Generalleutnant	Nikolaus Ritter von Endres
25 April 1919	General der Artillerie	Maximilian Ritter von Höhn

=== Headquarters staff during World War I ===
From 2 August 1914, its headquarters staff were:

- Commanding General: Gen. d. Inf. Oskar Ritter v. Xylander, Gen.-Lt. Nikolaus Ritter v. Endres as Führer from 23 June 1918
- Chief of General Staff: Gen.-Maj. Karl Frhr. v. Nagel zu Aichberg, Gen.-Maj. Möhl from 6 March 1915, Maj. Ludwig Graf v. Holnstein from Bavaria from 13 September 1916, Oberstlt. Friedrich Haack from 29 May 1918.
- General staff: Maj. Hans Hemmer, Hptm. Wilhelm Leeb, Hptm. Otto Frhr. v. Berchem, Hptm. Karl Deuringer
- Commander of Engineers: Major Georg Vogl

== See also ==
- Bavarian Army
- Franco-Prussian War order of battle
- German Army order of battle (1914)
- German Army order of battle, Western Front (1918)
- List of Imperial German infantry regiments
- List of Imperial German artillery regiments
- List of Imperial German cavalry regiments

== Bibliography ==
- (in German) von Dellmensingen Konrad Krafft & Feeser Friedrichfranz; Das Bayernbuch vom Weltkriege 1914-1918, Chr. Belser AG, Verlagsbuchhandlung, Stuttgart 1930
- Cron, Hermann (2002). Imperial German Army 1914-18: Organisation, Structure, Orders-of-Battle [first published: 1937]. Helion & Co. ISBN 1-874622-70-1.
- Ellis, John; Cox, Michael (1993). The World War I Databook. Aurum Press Ltd. ISBN 1-85410-766-6.
- Haythornthwaite, Philip J. (1996). The World War One Source Book. Arms and Armour. ISBN 1-85409-351-7.
- Histories of Two Hundred and Fifty-One Divisions of the German Army which Participated in the War (1914-1918), compiled from records of Intelligence section of the General Staff, American Expeditionary Forces, at General Headquarters, Chaumont, France 1919. The London Stamp Exchange Ltd. 1989 [1920]. ISBN 0-948130-87-3.
- The German Forces in the Field; 7th Revision, 11th November 1918; Compiled by the General Staff, War Office. Imperial War Museum, London and the Battery Press. 1995 [1918]. ISBN 978-1-870423-95-3.
