= Nouart =

- Commune
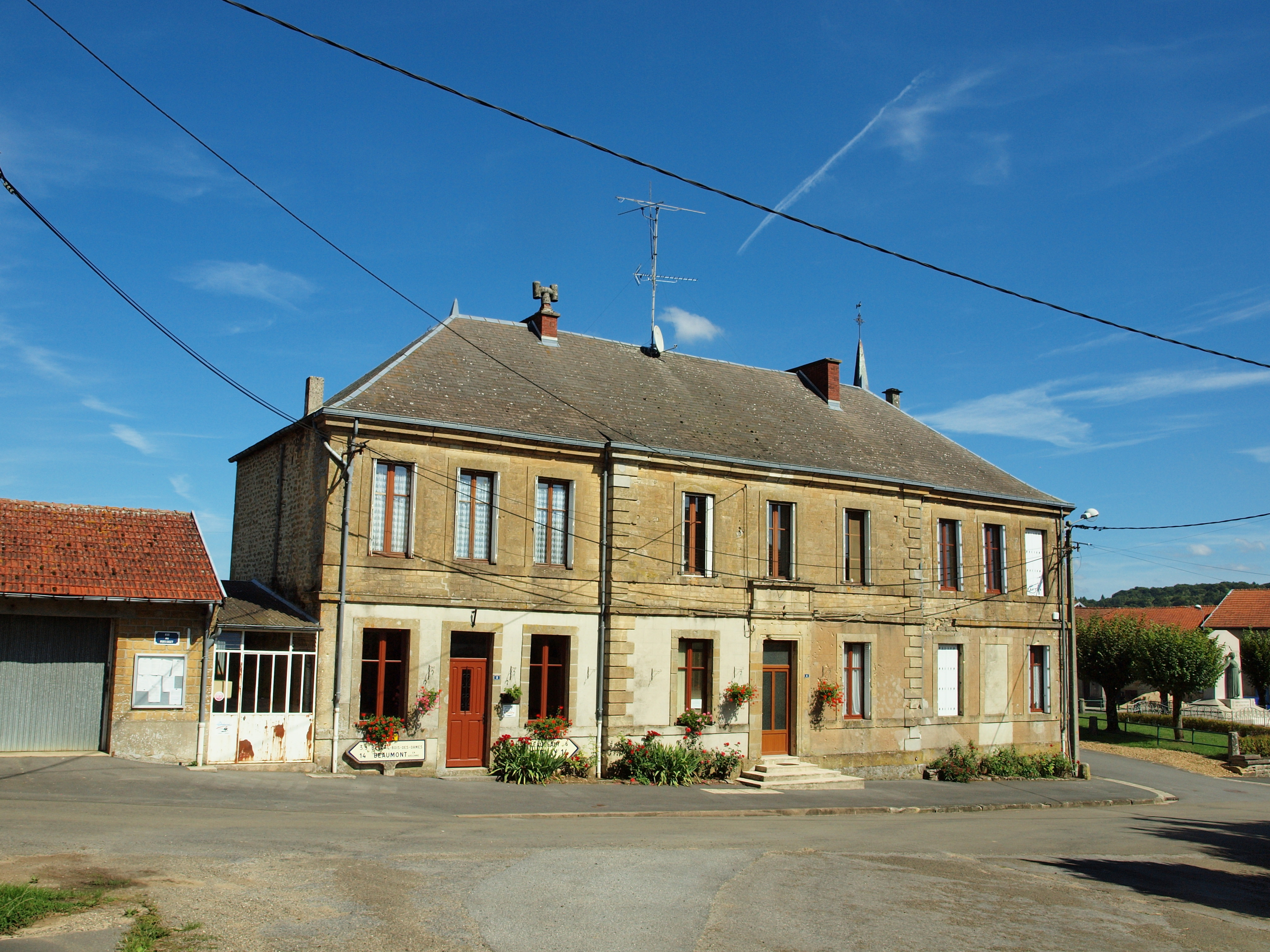
- The town hall in Nouart

- Coat of arms
- Location of Nouart
- Location within France Location within Grand Est
- Coordinates: 49°26′27″N 5°03′02″E
- Country: France
- Region: Grand Est
- Department: Ardennes
- Arrondissement: Vouziers
- Canton: Vouziers
- Intercommunality: Argonne Ardennaise

Government
  - Mayor (2020–2026): Xavier Pertus
- Area^{1}: 17.73 km^{2} (6.85 sq mi)
- Elevation: 216 m (709 ft)
- Highest elevation: 307 m (1,007 ft)
- Lowest elevation: 184 m (604 ft)
- Population (2023): 114
  - Density: 6.43/km^{2} (16.7/sq mi)
- Time zone: UTC+01:00 (CET)
  - Summer (DST): UTC+02:00 (CEST)
- INSEE/Postal code: 08326 /08240
- ^{1} French Land Register data, which excludes lakes, ponds, glaciers > 1 km^{2} (0.386 sq mi or 247 acres) and river estuaries.

Nouart (French pronunciation: [nwaʁ]) is a commune in the Ardennes department in northern France.

== Population ==
Historical population
Year	Pop.	±% p.a.
1968	240	—
1975	185	−3.65%
1982	167	−1.45%
1990	124	−3.65%
1999	140	+1.36%
2007	143	+0.27%
2012	145	+0.28%
2017	141	−0.56%
2023	114	−3.48%
Source: INSEE

== See also ==
- Communes of the Ardennes department
