= 5th Army Corps (France) =

- Country: France
- Type: Army Corps
- Garrison/HQ: Orléans (1906)
- Engagements: 1914 - Battle of the Ardennes

Commanders
- Notable commanders: Achille Baraguey d'Hilliers; Pierre Louis Charles de Failly; Antoine Baucheron de Boissoudy; Maurice Pellé

The 5th Army Corps was a military unit of the French Army which fought in the Franco-Prussian War and both World Wars. It comprised three divisions.

On 10 May 1940 the 12th Infantry Division was attached to the army corps, which formed part of 1st Army. Most of the division was sent to the Saint-Quentin area on that date, although 3^{e} GRDI were stationed to the south of Maubeuge in accordance with the Dyle Plan, Plan Yellow and the order to occupy the Gembloux sector near Namur.

The last commander was René Altmayer (June 1940).
