= Pierre Louis Charles de Failly =

French general

Pierre-Louis Charles de Failly
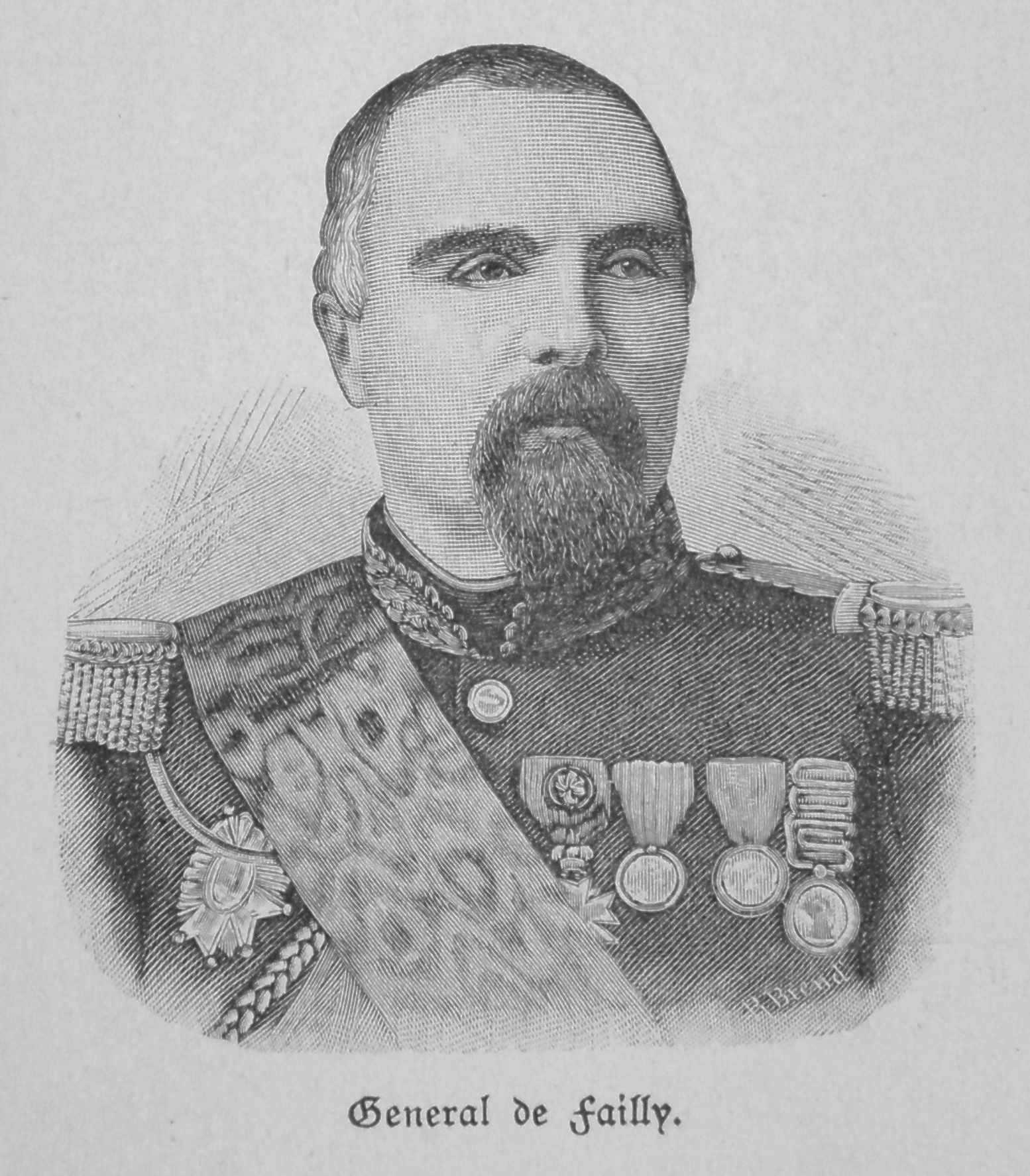
- General de Failly
- Born: 21 January 1810; Rozoy-sur-Serre, France
- Died: 15 November 1892 (aged 82); Compiègne, France
- Military career
- Allegiance: Bourbon Restoration; July Monarchy; French Second Republic; Second French Empire
- Branch: French Army
- Service years: 1826–1871
- Rank: Général de Division
- Commands: 2nd Infantry Division (1859); French Expeditionary Corps in Rome (1867); 3rd Corps (1869); 5th Corps (1870)
- Conflicts: Crimean War; Franco-Austrian War; Franco-Prussian War: Battle of Beaumont
- Awards: Grand Officer of the Legion of Honour; GCB; Order of the Medjidie 2nd Class; Crimea Medal; Médaille militaire

Pierre-Louis Charles de Failly (21 January 1810 – 15 November 1892) was a French general.

He was born in Rozoy-sur-Serre, Aisne, the son of Count Charles-Louis de Failly (descendant of a family of ancient nobility from Lorraine), and of Sophie Desmons de Maigneux. He was educated at the Saint-Cyr and entered the army in 1828.

By 1851, he had risen to the rank of colonel. Napoleon III, with whom he had favor, made him general of brigade in 1854 and general of division in 1855, after which Failly was for a time his aide-de-camp. During the Crimean War he served in the siege of Sevastopol. During the Austro-Sardinian War he commanded the 3rd Infantry Division in the 4th Corps. In 1867, he led the French expeditionary corps sent to protect the Papal States with which he defeated Giuseppe Garibaldi at Mentana, this action being the first in which the Chassepot rifle was used. Back in France, he was made a senator for life.

In 1870, during the Franco-Prussian War, Failly commanded the 5th Corps. His inactivity at Bitche on 6 August while the 1st Corps on his right and the 2nd Corps on his left were crushed at the battles of Wörth and Spicheren respectively, gave rise to the greatest indignation in France. Failly then commanded the right wing of Marshal de Mac-Mahon's Army of Châlons during the Sedan campaign, and the disastrous outcome of that campaign is partly ascribed to Failly's tactics, though he is certainly no more to blame than the other French generals. Failly and his 5th Corps were routed at Beaumont on 30 August 1870 by two corps led by George of Saxony. In this battle the French were surprised in their cantonments and driven back upon Mouzon. The defeat closed the southern escape route and forced the French Army of Châlons towards the Belgian frontier and encirclement at Sedan. He was captured by the Prussians at Sedan on 2 September, but was liberated some months later.

The rest of his life was spent in retirement. He died at Compiègne, aged 82.

Failly wrote Campagne de 1870. Opérations et marches du 5ème corps jusqu'au 31 août (Brussels, 1871).
