= Battle of Beaumont =

1870 battle in the Franco-Prussian War

Coordinates: 49.5392°N 5.0581°E

- Part of the Franco-Prussian War
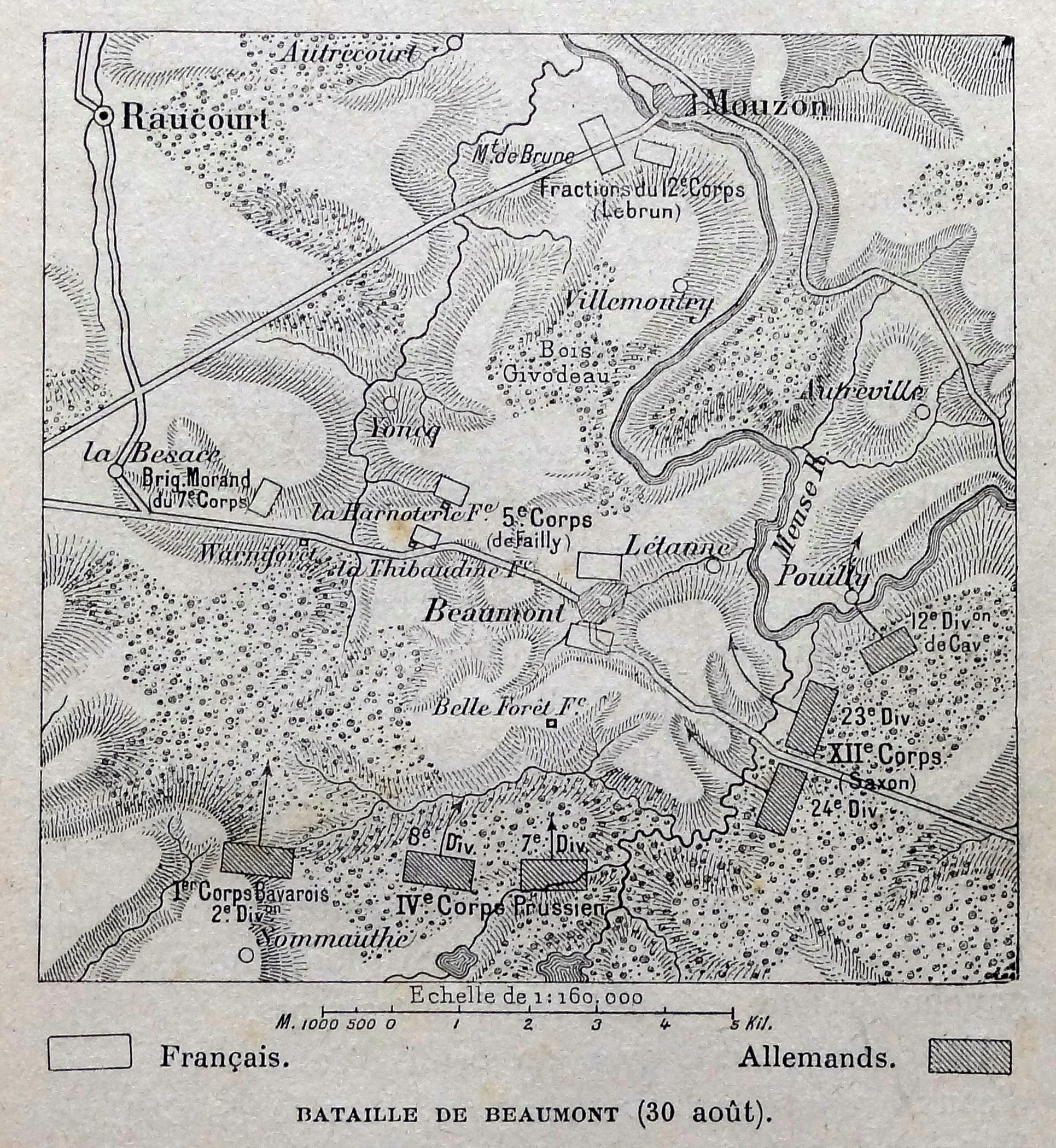
Date	30 August 1870
Location	near Beaumont-en-Argonne, France
Result	German victory

Belligerents
North German Confederation: Saxony; Bavaria	France

Commanders and leaders
(North German Confederation); Gustav von Alvensleben; Prince Georg of Saxony (Kingdom of Bavaria); Ludwig Freiherr von der Tann	(France) Pierre Louis Charles de Failly

Units involved
(North German Confederation) IV Corps (Saxony) XII Corps (Kingdom of Bavaria) I Royal Bavarian Corps	(France) V Corps

Casualties and losses
3,400	7,500

The Battle of Beaumont on 30 August 1870 was won by Prussia during the Franco-Prussian War.

It was fought between the French V Corps under general Pierre Louis Charles de Failly, and IV Corps under general Constantin von Alvensleben, XII Corps under Prince Georg of Saxony along with the I Royal Bavarian Corps under general Ludwig Freiherr von der Tann. The French were surprised in their cantonments and driven back upon Mouzon, with losses of 7,500 men and 42 guns to the Germans' 3,400.

== Bibliography ==
- Clodfelter, M. (2008). Warfare and armed conflicts : a statistical encyclopedia of casualty and other figures, 1494-2007. Jefferson, North Carolina: McFarland. ISBN 978-0786433193.
- Howard, M. (1991) [1961]. The Franco-Prussian War: The German Invasion of France 1870–1871. New York: Routledge. ISBN 0-415-26671-8.
- Wawro, G. (2003). The Franco-Prussian War: The German Conquest of France in 1870–1871. Cambridge: Cambridge University Press. ISBN 0-521-58436-1.
