= Armistice of Versailles =

Ended the Franco-Prussian War (1871)

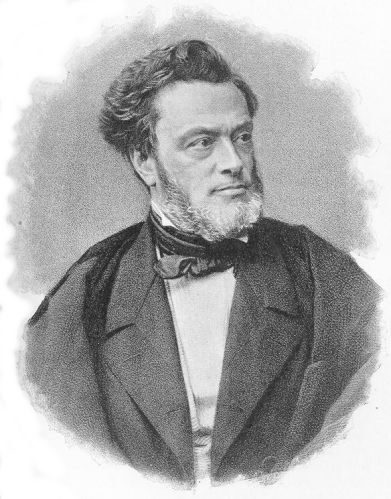
Jules Favre

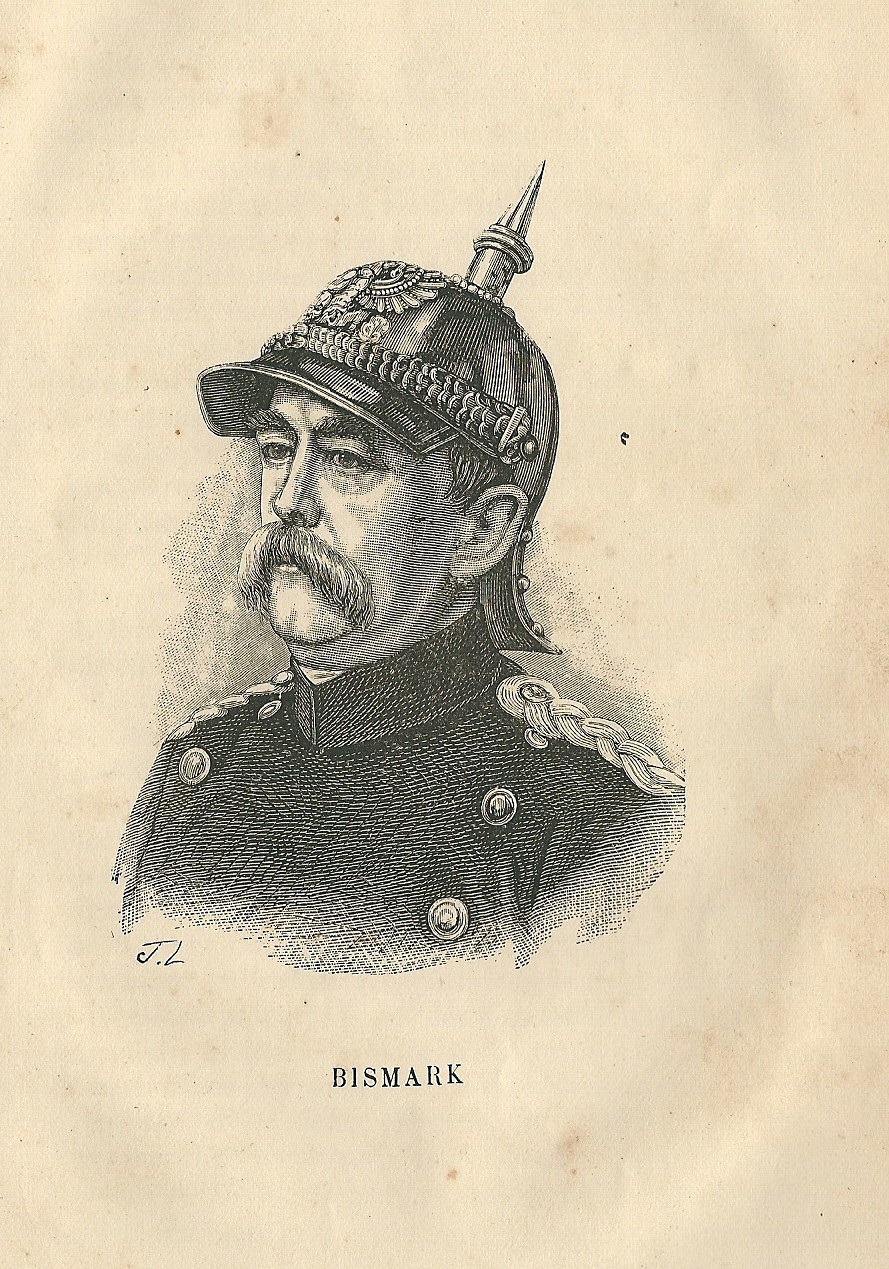
Otto von Bismarck

The Armistice of Versailles that came into effect on 28 January 1871 brought to an end the active phase of the Franco-Prussian War. The signatories were Jules Favre, foreign minister in the provisional Government of National Defence, for the French and Otto von Bismarck, chancellor of the newly established German Empire, for Prussia and her allies. The suspension of hostilities initially lasted until 19 February, when it was extended through 26 February, when a preliminary peace treaty was signed, also at Versailles. The definitive Treaty of Frankfurt was signed on 10 May. Although technically an armistice, the military position of France at the time and the terms were such that it was de facto a conditional surrender by the vanquished to the victors.

== First attempt ==
On the morning of 2 September, with the battle of Sedan raging about him, Napoleon III, Emperor of the French, ordered a white flag hoisted above the fortress of Sedan. The emperor then order the commander of the XII Corps, General Barthélémy Lebrun, to send a negotiator (parlementaire) to the Prussians with a request for an armistice. The chief of staff of the Army of Châlons refused to sign any such agreement on behalf of the nominal, but wounded commander, Patrice de Mac-Mahon, and General Auguste-Alexandre Ducrot disclaimed any authority to do so because he had already been countermanded once by his superior, General Emmanuel de Wimpffen. Nevertheless, Lebrun and a non-commissioned officer with a white pennant crossed the lines to seek an armistice "equally acceptable to both armies", bearing a formal letter to that effect. Wimpffen, who would have signed the local armistice, only learned of the effort when he saw the white flag moving along the road. He refused to allow it.

When the Prussian commander, Helmuth von Moltke, saw the white flag, he sent Fritz Bronsart von Schellendorf to find out what it meant. Napoleon sent him back with one of his own officers, General A.-C.-V. Reille, who carried a letter offering to surrender. After reading it, von Moltke sent Reille back with a letter of acceptance. Wimpffen was ordered to arrange the surrender. This day, Sedantag in German (French journée de Sedan), became a holiday in the German Empire. The first, brief attempt to avoid disaster through an armistice had failed and the emperor had become a prisoner of war.

== First negotiations ==
Favre, a staunch republican, was appointed vice president and minister of foreign affairs in the provisional government declared on 4 September 1870, after the capture of the Emperor Napoleon III. Like President Louis Jules Trochu, Favre did not believe France held a realistic chance of winning the war or even of defending Paris. Soon after the formation of the new government, Favre proposed to the cabinet that Germany be offered an indemnity in return for evacuating French territory. This was rejected, and Favre opened a channel of communications with Bismarck through the British ambassador in Paris, Lord Lyons. Bismarck questioned the legitimacy of the French government. On 17 September, Favre left Paris for the Prussian military headquarters to confer with Bismarck about an armistice. Only President Trochu and Minister of War Adolphe LeFlô of all the members of the government had knowledge of his plan.

Favre crossed the German lines with a flag of truce and met Bismarck at Montry. From there they proceeded to the headquarters at Château de Ferrières, where two full days were exhausted in discussion, but no armistice was arranged before Favre returned to Paris on 19 September. Favre offered an indemnity of 500,000,000 francs, but refused Bismarck's request for territorial concessions. Favre's early public pronouncement that "We will not surrender an inch of our territory, nor a stone of our fortresses!" had become a slogan in Paris and was posted all over the city in September–October 1870.

Favre argued that an armistice would allow the French to hold elections to an assembly that would have political legitimacy. Bismarck agreed, but refused to sign an armistice for such elections unless certain Parisian forts were surrendered in compensation for the advantage France would gain in time. Finally, Favre offered to surrender Strasbourg if its defenders received the honours of war. Bismarck demanded they become prisoners of war and discussion broke off. Before leaving Bismarck, Favre wept. On 20 September Favre reported his results to the cabinet, and Bismarck's terms were rejected completely. On 24 September the government indefinitely postponed local and national elections. In the words of Léon Gambetta, "We could not have elections without an armistice, and the effect of an armistice would be to relax the efforts of the defence."

On 1 October two neutral American officers, General Ambrose Burnside and Colonel Paul Forbes, were granted permission by the Germans to visit Paris as observers. When they returned they reported to the Germans the French conditions for an armistice: that it last two weeks, that elections be held, that Paris be revictualled and that no territory be ceded—although Favre had apparently come to accept the loss of Alsace. The American effort had no effect but to clarify to each side what was unacceptable to the other: the revictualling of Paris to the Germans and territorial concessions to the French.

== Second negotiations ==
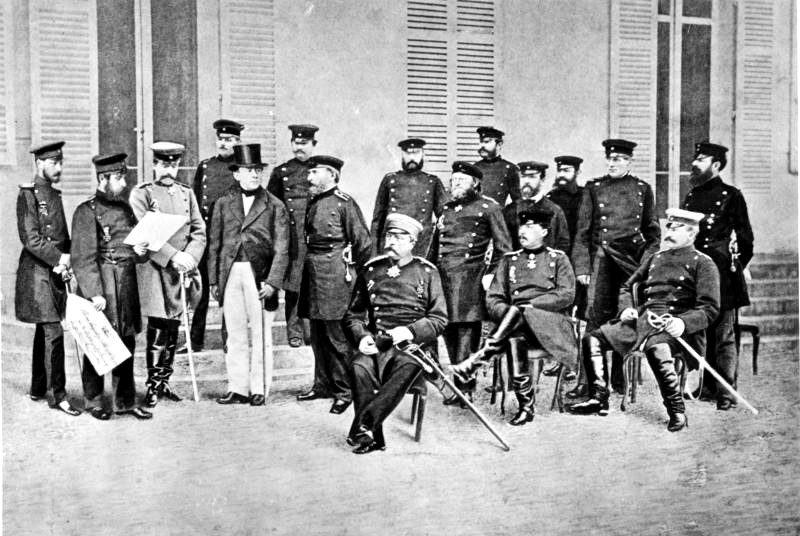
German headquarters at Versailles during the Franco-Prussian War

After the failure of the first effort at an armistice, the Government of National Defence sent Louis Adolphe Thiers on a diplomatic mission to the capitals of neutral Europe. At London Lord Granville offered to help negotiate an armistice, which offer was never taken up. When Thiers was granted a safe conduct through the German siege lines around Paris, he briefly met Bismarck, only to tell him that he was unauthorised to speak to the enemy. Bismarck told him that Metz had surrendered. When Thiers reported the results of his mission to the cabinet that evening, they agreed that an armistice was needed. Thiers volunteered to negotiate it, and was duly deputised. He was given two conditions that any armistice should meet: it should allow for free elections (including in France's occupied territories) to be held and it should allow the provisioning of Paris. On the morning of 31 October, the Journal officiel carried the first public notice that an armistice may be sought.

Thiers arrived at Versailles on 31 October and negotiations began the next day (1 November). Thiers initially asked for a 28-day armistice with provisioning of Paris and all besieged cities. Bismarck refused and countered by asking for one of the Parisian forts to balance the military advantages France would accrue from a ceasefire. Thiers rejected the surrender of any fortress. He later claimed that Bismarck had been amenable to French demands until news of the popular uprising in Paris had reached him. This uprising—accompanied by shouts of Pas d'armistice! (No armistice!)—had been a response to rumours of Thiers's negotiations. According to Thiers it caused Bismarck to increase his demands, but Lord Lyons believed that the chancellor was merely looking for an excuse to break off talks.

Having failed to reach an agreement on armistice terms, Thiers tried to uncover the Germans' intentions for the peace treaty. Bismarck threatened that the terms for peace would get harsher the longer the war lasted. As of 5 November, he was demanding Alsace with Strasbourg, part of Lorraine not including Metz and an indemnity of 4,000,000,000 francs. On that date, on the Pont de Sèvres, between the German and French lines, Thiers met Favre and counselled acceptance of Bismarck's terms. He offered to take "the responsibility and odium of signing a treaty", according to a letter of Lord Lyons, but Favre would not agree. On 6 November Thiers was back at Versailles when Favre ordered him to break off negotiations and go to Tours. He was escorted to the French lines by German soldiers and from there took a train to Tours. He arrived sitting atop a heap of coal.

== Third negotiations ==
There was no effort to end the war by diplomatic means between 6 November 1870 and 23 January 1871. During that period Favre and Ernest Picard were the only voices in the government advocating a capitulation or a sortie torrentielle, a major military undertaking. By 27 December, when howitzers had begun to strike the Parisian fortresses, the city was facing famine and loss of morale. On 5 January the residential areas of the city fell under bombardment. The last gasp of French military resistance came at the battle of Buzenval on 19 January. They were defeated. On 20 January Trochu asked for a local armistice to bury the dead, but Bismarck refused. The French president resigned, and on 22 January when a council of war proposed a second mass sortie, there was no officer willing to lead it.

On 23 January, Favre was empowered by the cabinet to seek a general armistice, as opposed to the armistice limited to Paris that Trochu favoured. Such a local ceasefire, Favre argued, would only give the Germans the freedom to concentrate their military power on the provincial armies. Favre was not empowered to negotiate a treaty, since that was supposed to only follow elections to a national assembly. He was to permit the disarming of regular soldiers, but not of the National Guard, whose disarming was either feared lest it result in a popular uprising or promoted lest the Guard initiate an uprising. He was not to concede the Germans entry into Paris. He arrived at Versailles under a safe conduct later that evening.

Favre admitted to the Germans that Paris was starving, and at Bismarck's request he wrote down an outline of an armistice, including in it the cession of one of the Parisian forts, which would effectively end the siege of Paris in Germany's favour. Bismarck agreed not to enter Paris and to allow the defenders to remain in the city; he would permit a free election and allow the Guard and one regular division to remain armed. The disarming of the rest made it impossible later on for the government to suppress the Paris Commune, whose uprising was possible because the Guard retained its arms.

On 24 January Bismarck agreed to abandon his other negotiations—with the exiled Empress Eugénie and her representative, Clément Duvernois—and on 25 January the government authorised Favre to sign an armistice for three weeks. On 26 January Bismarck graciously offered to cease the bombardment of Paris and Favre accepted. A general Parisian ceasefire was agreed for midnight (27 January) and commanders on both sides were given advanced notice. "A few stray shots were fired after the deadline", the armistice was de facto in effect from that moment. The oral accord in effect from this time mandated that:

- Hostilities were to cease on land and at sea.
- The Parisian forts were to be surrendered.
- An elected assembly was to vote on whether to end the war or continue it before the expiration of the armistice.
- An indemnity of 200,000,000 francs was levied on France.

These terms were to be in effect until 19 February. Owing to a lack of information about operations in the departments of Jura, Doubs and Côte-d'Or, these areas were exempted from the general armistice terms in order to preserve the fortified region of Belfort, then under siege. The primary source for the extent of the agreement reached on the date of the ceasefire is the diary of the future German emperor Frederick III, based on his contacts with Bismarck.

== Fourth and final negotiations ==
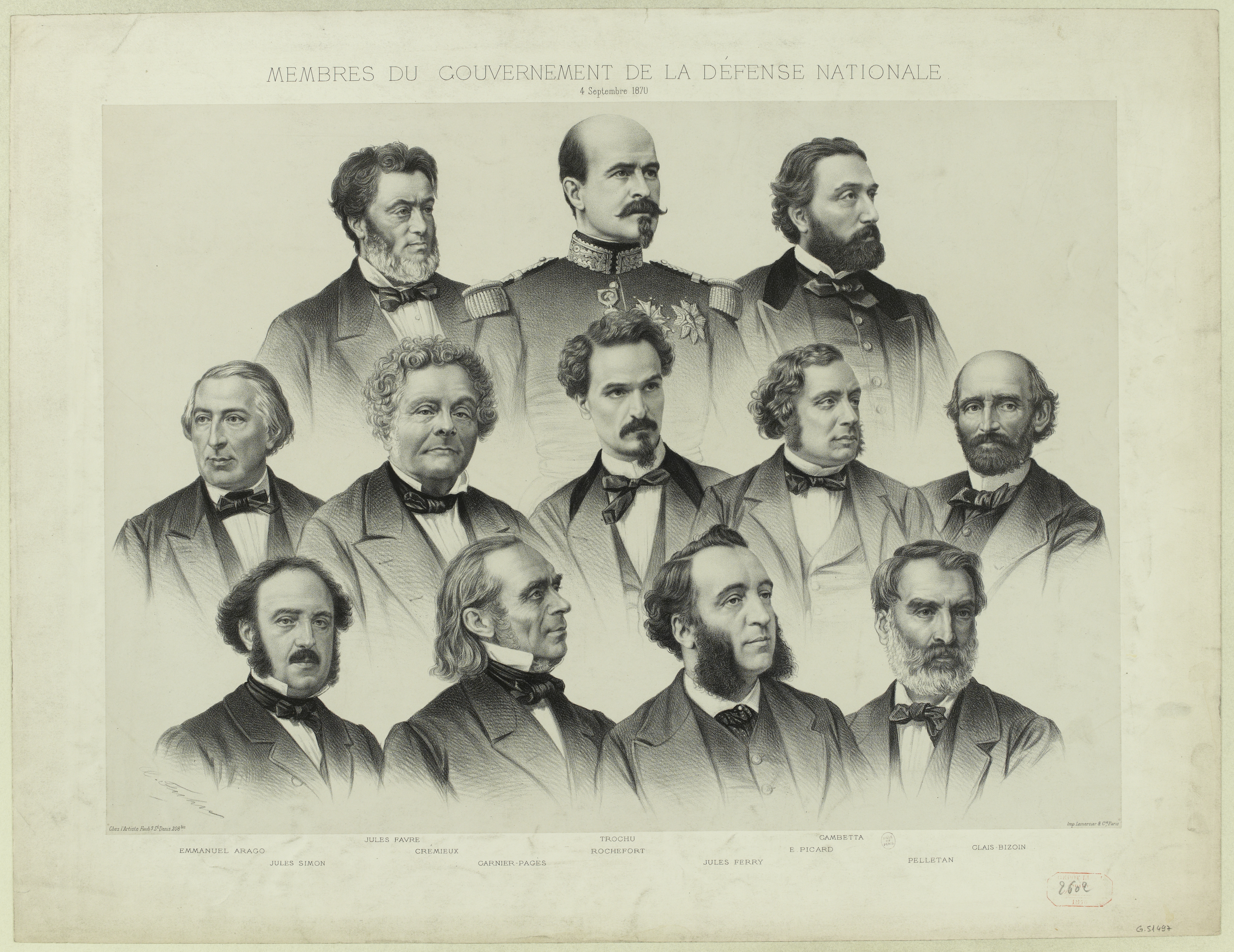
The Government of National Defence

In Paris Favre requested an officer to help him negotiate the technical articles of the formal armistice. He and General Charles de Beaufort d'Hautpoul returned to Versailles on 27 January, but, according to German accounts, the latter got drunk at the dinner celebration and Favre had to get a postponement of the final negotiations to the next day (28 January). On this second try a more competent officer, Charles Horix de Valdan, chief of staff to the commander of Paris, Joseph Vinoy, was sent along. Lacking sources of information on the disposition of his own troops at the time, Valdan relied on that supplied by von Moltke in demarcating the lines of control of the two sides. Both sides were to withdraw ten miles from the lines of control and the area between the German siege works and the disarmed Parisian forts was to be neutral. When Valdan had completed the technical military matters, Favre and Bismarck signed the final document on 28 January 1871. It immediately came into effect in Paris, and on 31 January in the other pertinent areas.

The Army of the East under General Justin Clinchant, still operating in Jura, Doubs and Côte-d'Or, was not informed that the armistice did not apply to its area. Favre had neglected to inform the government in Bordeaux. It mistakenly halted and was surrounded by the better-informed German troops of the Army of the South under General Edwin von Manteuffel. On 31 January, having already negotiated safe passage for wounded soldiers into Switzerland and having received from his government confirmation that no armistice for his zone would be forthcoming, Clinchant signed a convention with the Swiss at the border post of Les Verrières, allowing his army to retreat across the frontier. On 1 February the whole road from Pontarlier to the border was filled with retreating troops, and the last skirmish of the war was fought at La Cluse by men of the reserve, who held off the Germans before joining their comrades in Switzerland.

On 2 February news reached Versailles that on 27 January the Delegation of the Government of National Defence at Bordeaux had publicly proclaimed that "[w]e cannot believe that negotiations of this kind could have been undertaken without the Delegation being previously notified." The late arrival of this news had no effect on the armistice, and in the interim the Delegation had obeyed the order from Versailles to publish the armistice, inform the provincial armies and begin preparations for a general election. Nonetheless, when Jules Simon, representing the government, met the Delegation in Bordeaux on 31 January, he ordered removed the placards that read:

Let us make use of the Armistice as a school for instruction for our young troops. . . In place of the reactionary and cowardly Assembly of which the enemy dreams, let us install an Assembly that is truly national and republican, desiring peace, if peace assures our honour ... but capable of willing war also, ready for anything rather than lend a hand in the murder of France.

On 6 February the leader of the Delegation, Gambetta, resigned. On 8 February the promised elections to the National Assembly took place. The body met in Bordeaux on 12 February. It had a monarchist majority and a mandate for peace. On 15 February the fort of Belfort under Colonel Pierre Philippe Denfert-Rochereau was finally incorporated into the armistice. Its defenders marched out with the honours of war on 18 February. On 19 February the members of the National Assembly swore the "Pact of Bordeaux", a truce between the parties until the Third Republic was established.

The armistice remained in effect even after the preliminary treaty of 26 February. Either was permitted to denounce it any day after 3 March, and to renew the fighting three days after that. On 1 March the Germans began their occupation of Paris. On 3 March they began to pull their troops out, yet riots erupted in Paris as the German troops marched out.

== Sources ==
- Howard, Michael (1961). The Franco-Prussian War: German Invasion of France, 1870–1871. New York: Routledge.
- Kyte, George Wallace (1946). "The Vanquished Must Surrender: Jules Favre and the Franco-German Armistice of 1871". Historian. 9: 19–36. doi:10.1111/j.1540-6563.1946.tb01102.x.
