= Reille =

Reille is a French surname. Notable people with the surname include:

- André Charles Victor Reille (1815–1887), French general
- Honoré Charles Reille (1775–1860), Marshal of France
- René Reille (1835–1898), French soldier, industrialist and politician
