= Sedantag =

Memorial holiday in the German Empire

Day of Sedan
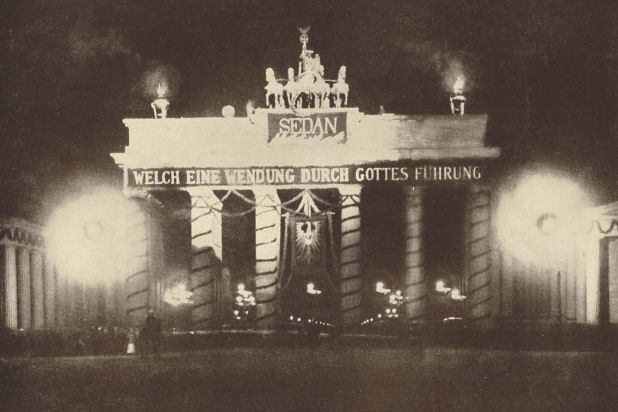
- Illuminated Brandenburg Gate on Sedantag in 1898, (text on the banner: "What a turnaround through God's guidance")
- Official name: Sedantag
- Observed by: Germans
- Celebrations: Victory Day
- Begins: 1871
- Ends: 1918
- Date: 2 September
- Frequency: Annual
- Related to: Unification of Germany

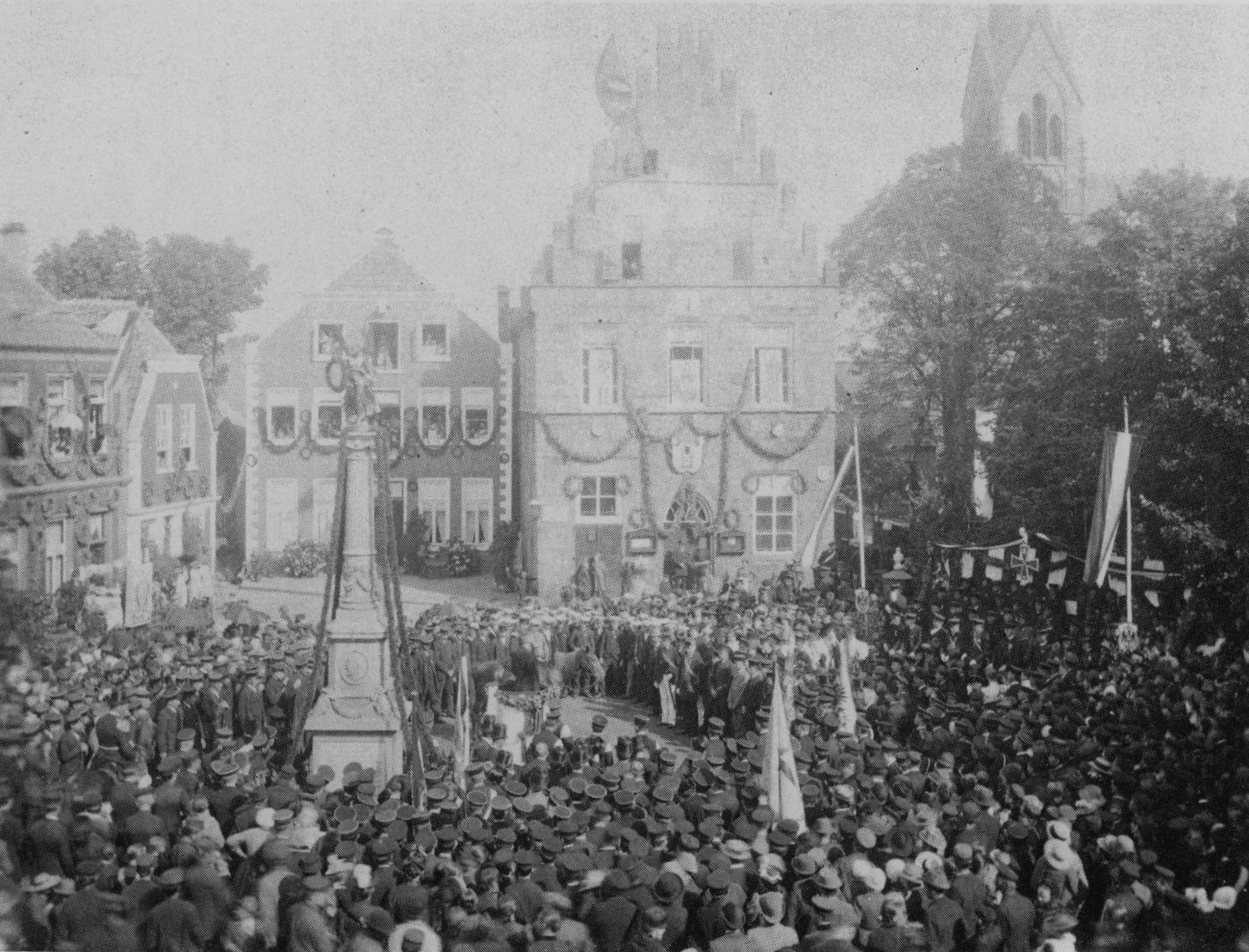
Sedantag in Schüttorf in 1895

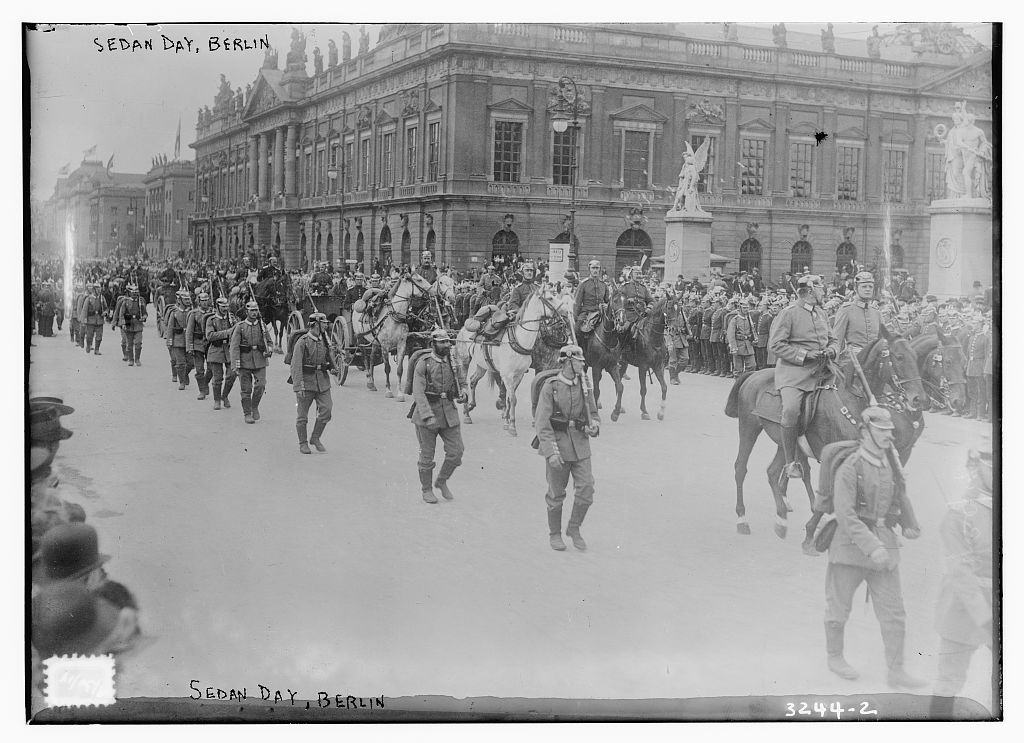
Sedantag in Berlin in 1914

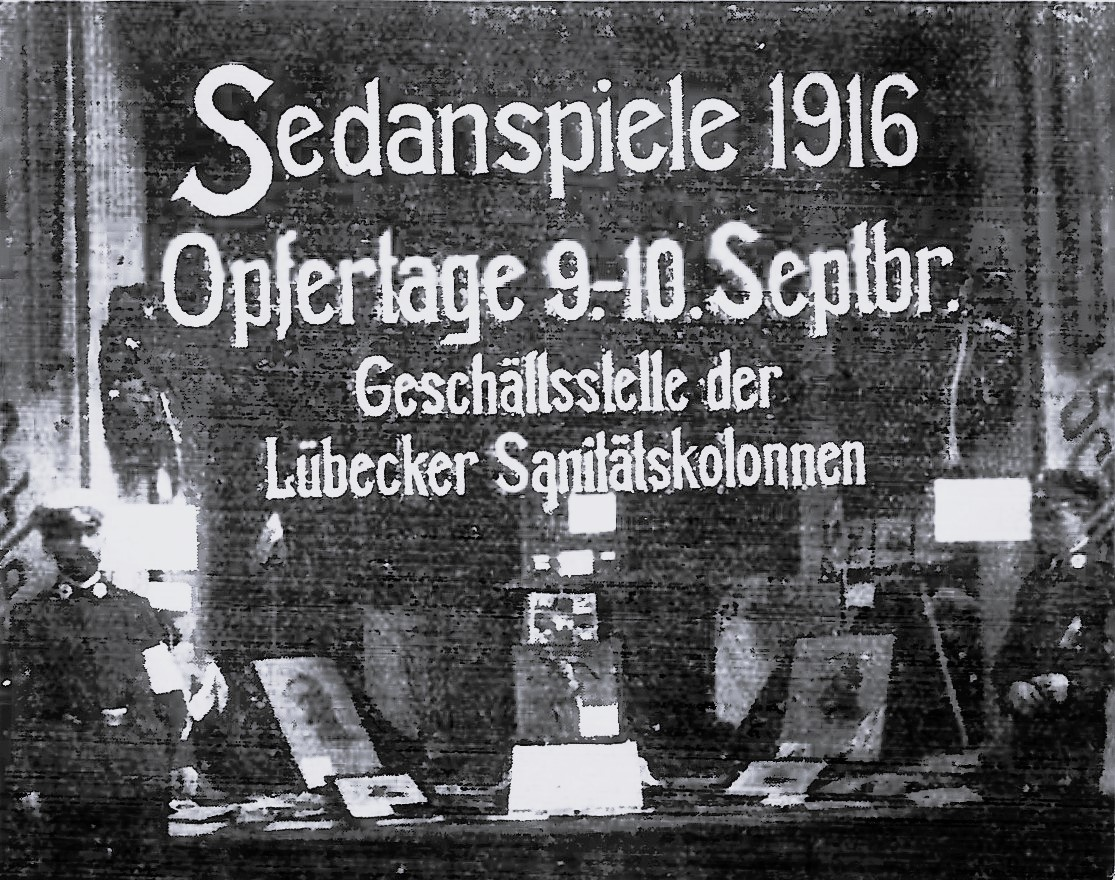
The exhibited trophies of Sedan Festival (Lübeck)

Sedantag (German: [ˈzeːdanˌtaːk], Day of Sedan) was a semi-official memorial holiday in the German Empire celebrated on the second day of September to commemorate the victory in the 1870 Battle of Sedan. After the outbreak of the Franco-Prussian War a few weeks earlier, French emperor Napoleon III and his army were taken prisoner in the fortress of Sedan by Prussian troops, a major step to eventual victory.

In 1871, the now united Germans could not agree on a common German holiday. While the German Emperor and Empire were proclaimed on 18 January 1871, the Prussians themselves held the first coronation of a Prussian king on the same day in 1701 in higher esteem. The signing of the final peace Treaty of Frankfurt, several months later on 10 May 1871, was also not unequivocally welcomed. The southern states of Kingdom of Bavaria, the Grand Duchy of Baden and Kingdom of Württemberg preferred to celebrate the victories in battles to which their troops had contributed significantly, such as the Battle of Wörth, which had occurred already on 6 August 1870.

While never proclaimed officially, and participation and official support for Sedantag celebrations varied over time, and working class leaders never really accepting it, Sedantag became a de facto national holiday, last celebrated in 1918.

After the Treaty of Versailles had been signed on June 28, 1919, on 27 August 1919 the Ministry of the Interior of the Weimar Republic declared that no further Sedantag celebrations should take place.

== Literature ==
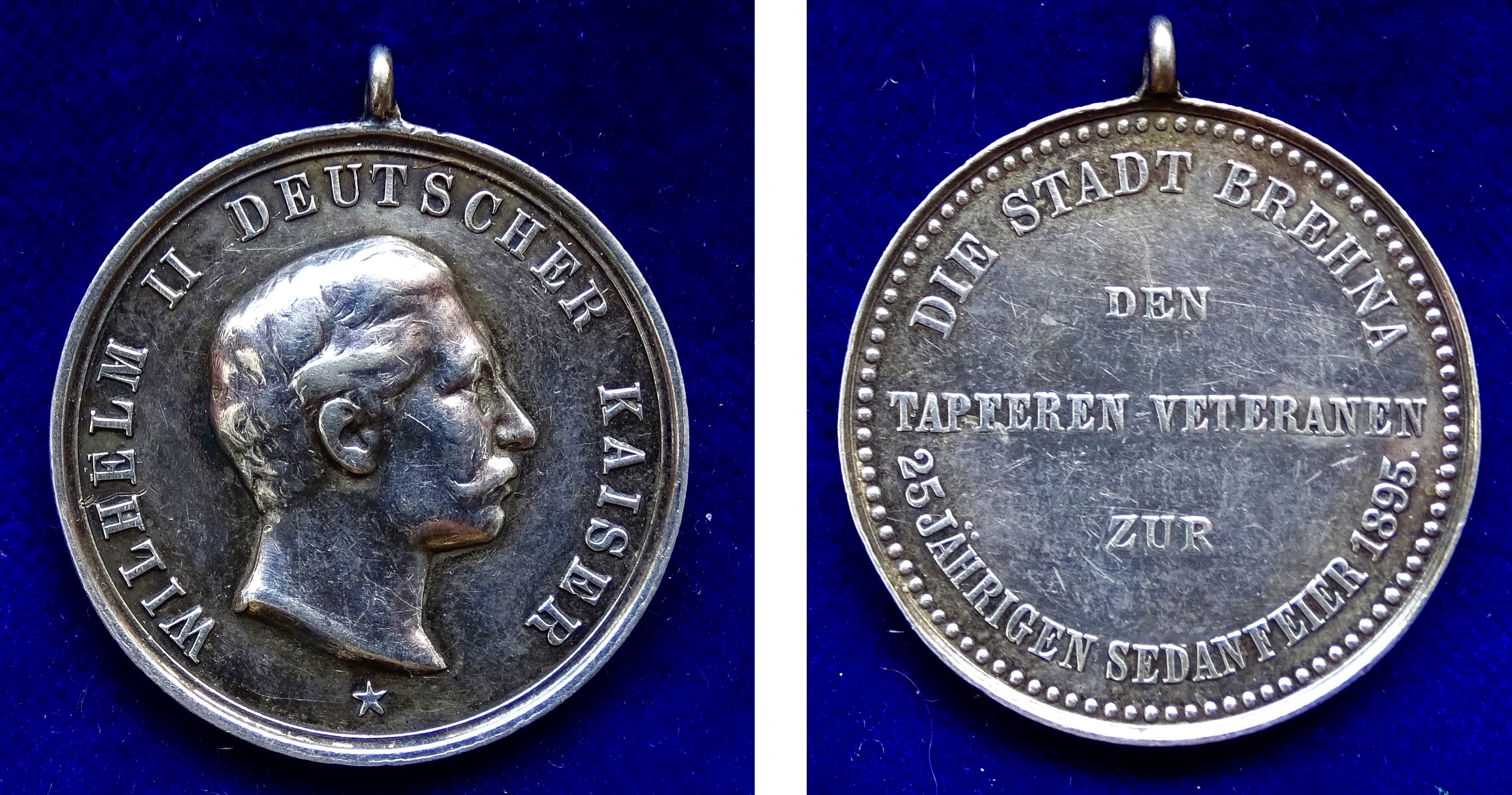
Silver Medal Day of Sedan 1895 awarded to Prussian war veterans by the small town of Brehna near Halle, today in Sachsen-Anhalt

- Florentine Gebhart: Erinnerung an das Sedanfest in den 1870er Jahren. In: Blätter aus dem Lebensbilderbuch. Berlin 1930, S. 51–54 (Nachdruck in Jens Flemmin (Hrsg.): Quellen zur Alltagsgeschichte der Deutschen vom Mittelalter bis heute. Band 7. 1871–1914. Wissenschaftliche Buchgesellschaft, Darmstadt 1997, ISBN 3-534-11496-5, pp. 61–64; außerdem frei verfügbar als PDF)
- Thomas Rohkrämer: Der Militarismus der „kleinen Leute". Die Kriegervereine im Deutschen Kaiserreich 1871–1914. (= Beiträge zur Militärgeschichte; Bd. 29). Oldenbourg, München 1990, ISBN 3-486-55859-5 (zugl. Dissertation, Universität Freiburg im Breisgau, 1989)
- Fritz Schellack: Nationalfeiertage in Deutschland 1871 bis 1945. Peter Lang, Frankfurt am Main u. a. 1990, ISBN 3-631-42524-4 (zugl. Dissertation, Universität Mainz 1989)
- Jakob Vogel: Nationen im Gleichschritt. (= Kritische Studien zur Geschichtswissenschaft; Bd. 118). Vandenhoeck & Ruprecht, Göttingen 1997, ISBN 3-525-35781-8 (zugl. Dissertation, FU Berlin, 1995)
- Rüdiger Wulf: „Hurra, heut ist ein froher Tag, des Kaisers Wiegenfest!" Schulfeiern zum Kaisergeburtstag und zum Sedantag des Kaiserreichs. In: Jochen Löher und Rüdiger Wulf (Hrsg.): „Furchtbar dräute der Erbfeind!" Vaterländische Erziehung in den Schulen des Kaiserreichs 1871–1918. (= Schriftenreihe des Westfälischen Schulmuseums Dortmund; Band 3). Westfälisches Schulmuseum, Dortmund 1998, pp. 57–95
- Landeshauptarchiv Koblenz, Landesarchivverwaltung Rheinland-Pfalz: Vor 100 Jahren – Der Sedantag am 2. September 1899 (Archivseite)

== See also ==
- German Unity Day
