= Bordeaux Pact =

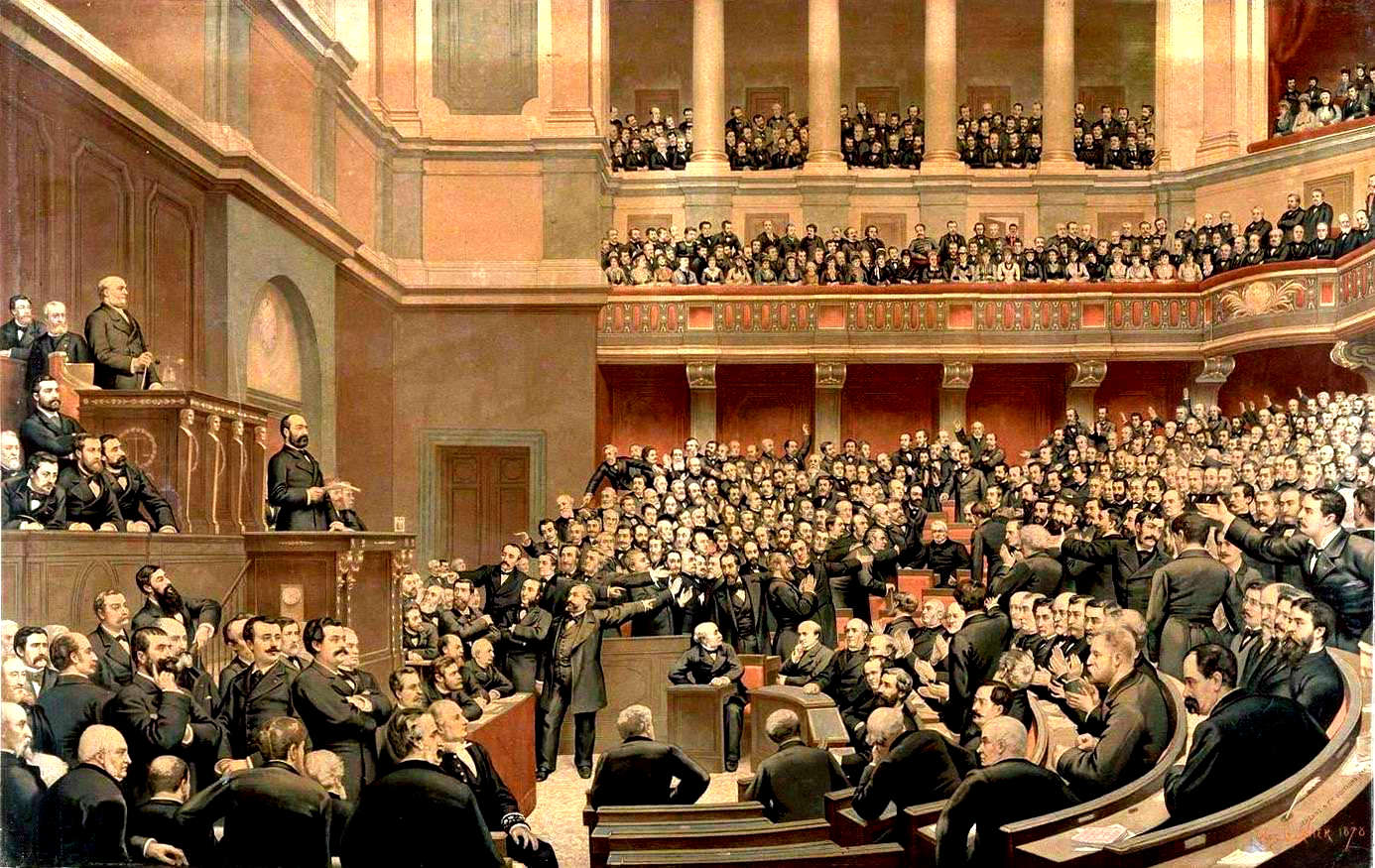
Le Libérateur du territoire, Jules Garnier, 1878, Musée du Château de Versailles. During the session of 16 June 1877, opposition deputies, contesting the legitimacy of the Cabinet, challenged the Government. In response, the Minister of the Interior, Fourtou, stated, "The men in the Government are drawn from the Assembly elected in 1871, which can be said to have been the pacifier and liberator of the territory." In response, several members of the Assembly stood and pointed to Mr. Thiers: "Here is the liberator of the territory!"

The Bordeaux Pact refers to a proclamation made by Adolphe Thiers on 10 March 1871, establishing an institutional status quo between monarchists and republicans during the early days of the French Third Republic. This pact delayed the debate over the form of the new regime.

To end the Franco-Prussian War, the Government of National Defense requested an armistice with Prussia on 28 January 1871. Bismarck refused, insisting that negotiations could only take place with representatives elected by the people. Consequently, a National Assembly was elected on 8 February 1871. This Assembly, dominated by monarchists seeking peace, appointed Adolphe Thiers as head of the Executive Power on 17 February 1871. The peace treaty was signed in Frankfurt am Main on 10 May 1871.

The monarchists, who held a majority in the Assembly, were divided between Legitimists (a minority with 182 seats) and Orleanists (the majority with 214 seats). They anticipated a swift restoration of the monarchy, while the republicans, a minority in the Assembly, aimed to reform the Republic. Adolphe Thiers sought to avoid deciding the regime's nature until peace with Prussia was secured and postponed the debate to navigate this opposition. This agreement, known as the Bordeaux Pact, was reached while the government was based in Bordeaux. The pact was formalized between Thiers and the National Assembly, which convened at the Grand Théâtre.

Despite the pact, the regime quickly adopted a parliamentary character, and Thiers clashed with the Assembly as the government moved toward a conservative Republic. Paradoxically, these conflicts and the failure of the monarchist Restoration strengthened the Republic's tendency. The Rivet decree, passed almost unanimously, named Adolphe Thiers "Head of the Executive Power" of the French Third Republic. The Rivet law (31 August 1871), the first constitutional act, officially designated Thiers as President of the Republic while stripping him of all executive power.

== Bibliography ==
- Démier, F. (2000). La France du 19th century : 1814-1914. Éditions du Seuil. 294 p.
- Fureix, E. (2014). Le siècle des possibles : 1814-1914. Paris: Presses universitaires de France. 148 p.
