= Battle of Sedan =

1870 battle during the Franco-Prussian War

- Part of the Franco-Prussian War
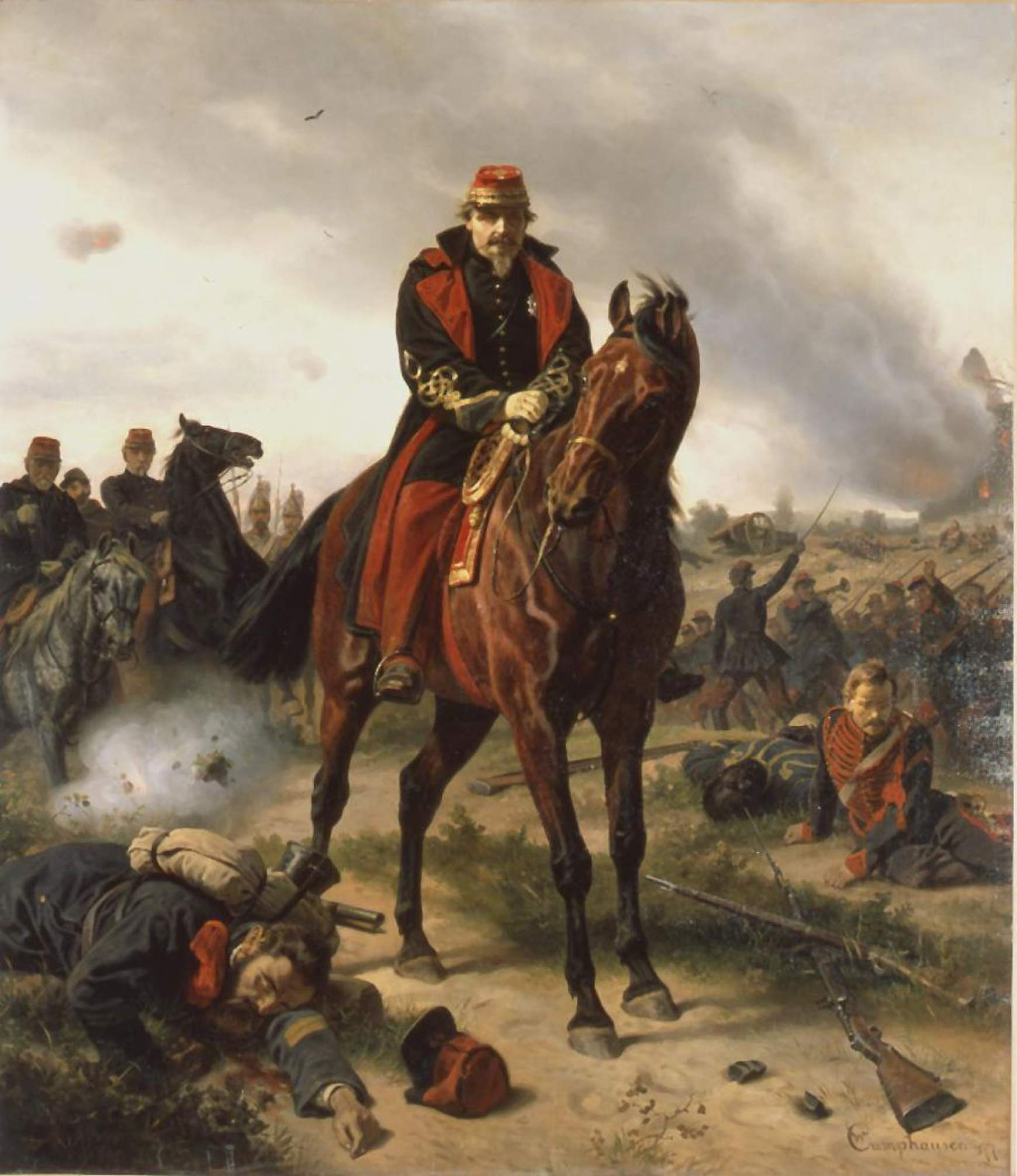
- Napoleon III at the Battle of Sedan, by Wilhelm Camphausen.
Date	1–2 September 1870
Location	Sedan, France 49°41′55″N 4°56′44″E
Result	German victory; Capture of Napoleon III; Fall of the Second French Empire

Belligerents
North German Confederation: Prussia; Saxony; Bavaria	France

Commanders and leaders
Wilhelm I; Otto von Bismarck; Helmuth von Moltke; Friedrich Wilhelm; Albert, Prince of Saxony; Ludwig von der Tann	Napoleon III (surrendered) (POW); Patrice MacMahon (WIA); Auguste-Alexandre Ducrot (POW); Félix Wimpffen (surrendered); Jean Auguste Margueritte (DOW)

Units involved
Third Army; Fourth Army	Army of Châlons

Strength
200,000	120,000–130,000

Casualties and losses
1,310 killed 6,443 wounded 2,107 missing	3,220 killed 14,811 wounded 104,000 captured

The Battle of Sedan, also known as the First Battle of Sedan, was fought during the Franco-Prussian War from 1 to 2 September 1870. Resulting in the capture of Emperor Napoleon III and over a hundred thousand troops, it effectively decided the war in favour of Prussia and its allies; however, fighting continued under a new French government.

The 130,000-strong French Army of Châlons, commanded by Marshal Patrice de MacMahon and accompanied by Napoleon III, was attempting to lift the siege of Metz, only to be caught by the Prussian Fourth Army and defeated at the Battle of Beaumont on 30 August. Commanded by Generalfeldmarschall Helmuth von Moltke and accompanied by Prussian King Wilhelm I and Prussian Chancellor Otto von Bismarck, the Fourth Army and the Prussian Third Army encircled MacMahon's army at Sedan in a battle of annihilation. Marshal MacMahon was wounded during the attacks and command passed to General Auguste-Alexandre Ducrot, until it was assumed by General Emmanuel Félix de Wimpffen.

Bombarded from all sides by German artillery and with all breakout attempts defeated, the French Army of Châlons capitulated on 2 September, with 104,000 men passing into German captivity along with 558 guns. Napoleon III was taken prisoner, while the French government in Paris continued the war and proclaimed a Government of National Defense on 4 September. The German armies besieged Paris on 19 September.

== Background ==
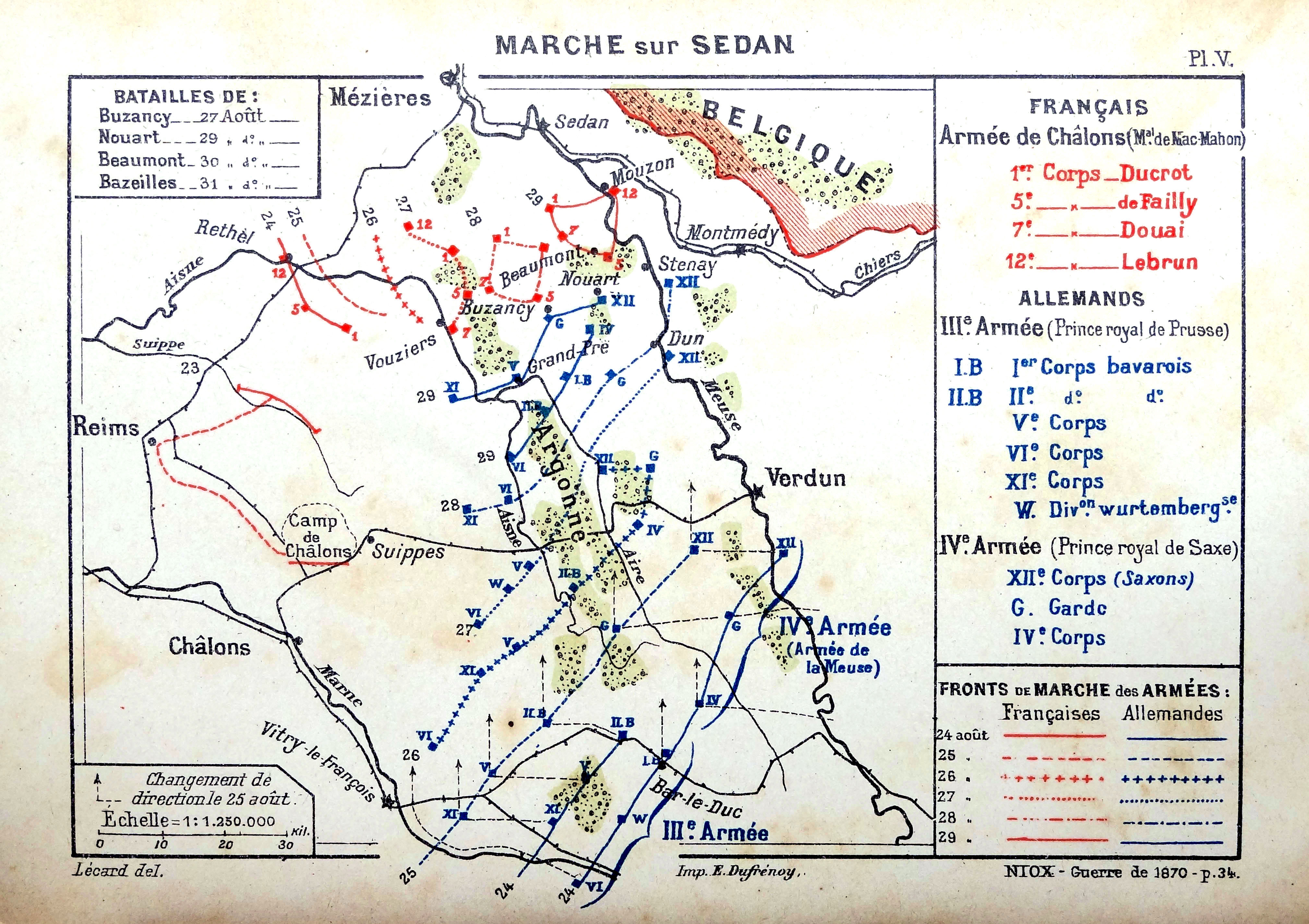
The movements of the French and German armies from 23 to 29 August. Red: French, Blue: Germans

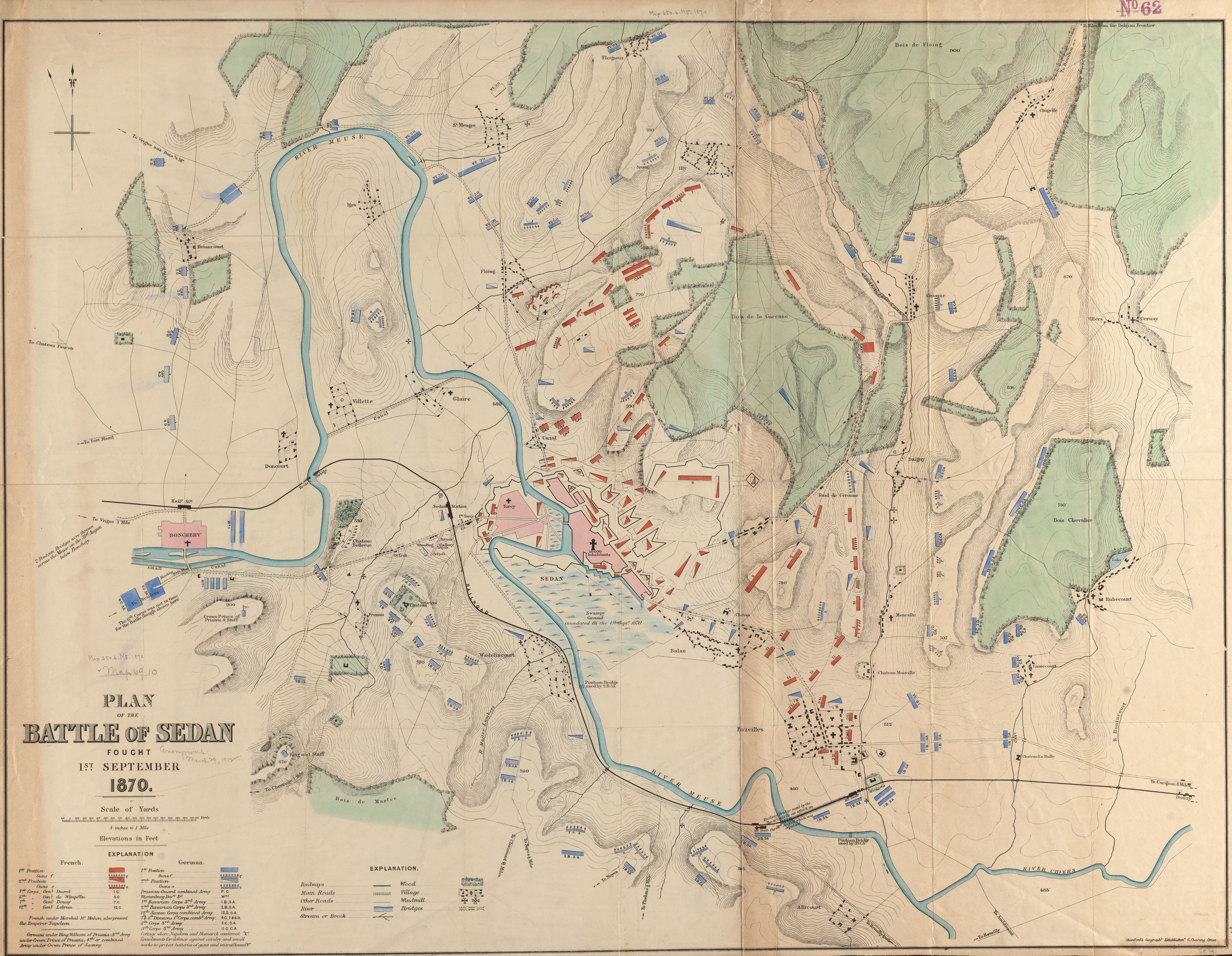
Detailed plan of the battle of Sedan, fought 1st September 1870

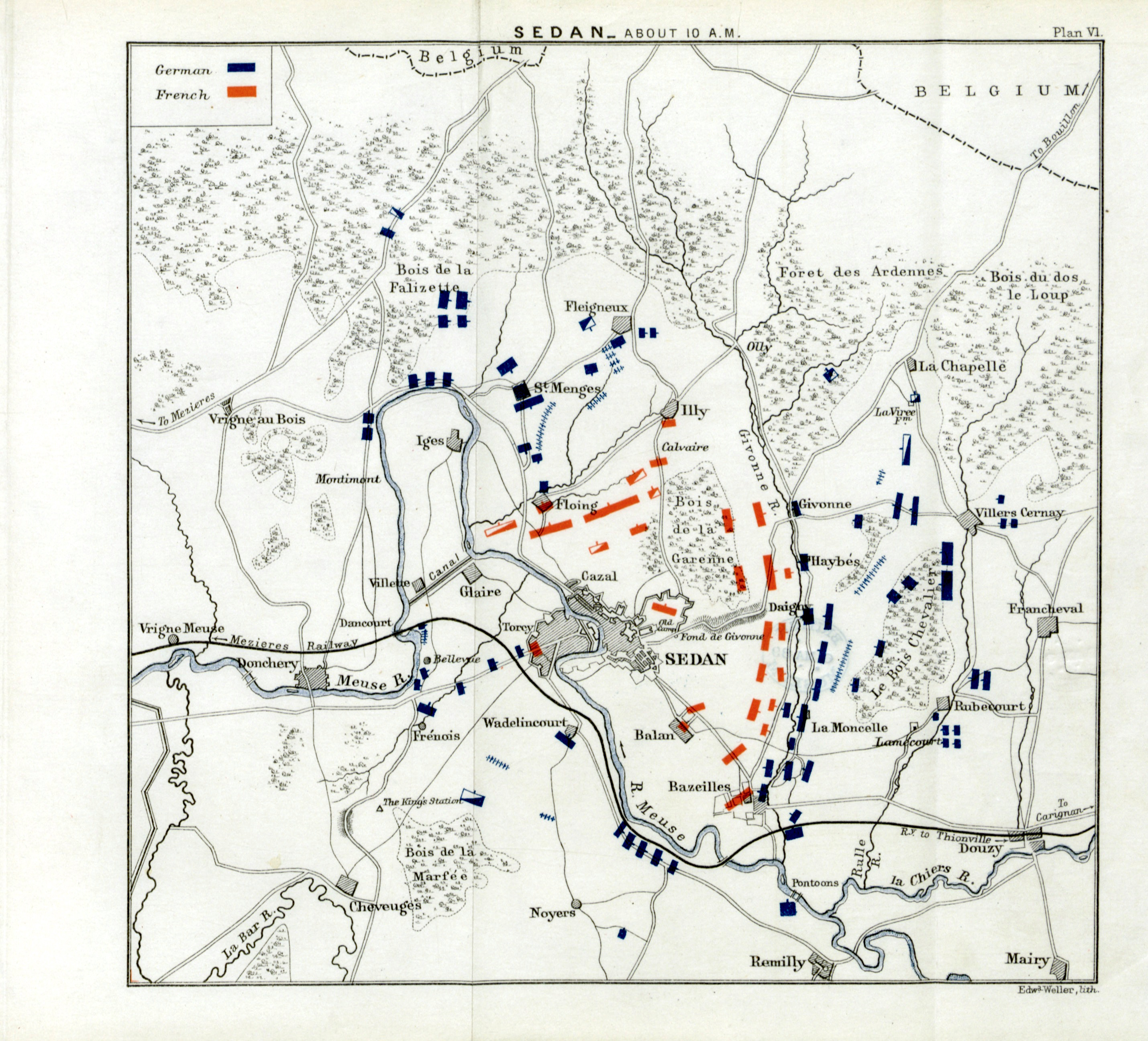
Situation about 10 AM

After its pyrrhic victory at the Battle of Gravelotte on 18 August, Marshal François Achille Bazaine's 150,000-man Army of the Rhine retreated to Metz where it was surrounded by 168,000 Prussian troops of the First and Second Armies in the siege of Metz beginning on 19 August. Emperor Napoleon III, along with Marshal Patrice de MacMahon, formed the new French Army of Châlons on 17 August to march on to Metz to rescue Bazaine. With Napoleon III personally leading the army, and with Marshal MacMahon in attendance, they led the Army of Châlons after 23 August in a left-flanking march northeast towards the Belgian border in an attempt to avoid the Prussians before striking south to link up with Bazaine.

The Prussians had repeatedly outmaneuvered the French in the string of victories through August, and the march depleted the French forces and left both flanks exposed. The Prussians, under the command of von Moltke, took advantage of this maneuver to catch the French in a pincer movement. Leaving the Prussian First and Second Armies besieging Metz, Moltke took the Prussian Third and Fourth Armies northward where they caught up with the French at the Battle of Beaumont on 30 August.

After a major defeat in which he lost 7,500 men and 40 cannons, MacMahon aborted the planned link-up with Bazaine and ordered the Army of Châlons to withdraw north-west towards the obsolete 17th-century fortress of Sedan. His intention was to rest the army, which had been involved in a long series of marches, resupply it with ammunition and, in his words, maneuver in front of the enemy. MacMahon underestimated the German strength and believed the hills surrounding Sedan would offer a major defensive advantage. The French rear was protected by the fortress of Sedan, and offered a defensive position at the Calvaire d'Illy, which had both hills and woods to provide cover for any defense. MacMahon denied a request from General Félix Douay, commander of 7th Corps, to dig trenches, claiming the army would not remain at Sedan for long.

Upon arrival in the vicinity of Sedan on 31 August, MacMahon deployed Douay's 7th Corps to the north-west on the crest between the Calvaire and Floing. Auguste-Alexandre Ducrot's 1st Corps faced east, while Lebrun's 12th Corps garrisoned Bazeilles. The recently arrived General Emmanuel Félix de Wimpffen assumed command of 5th Corps from Pierre Louis Charles de Failly, the unit having been routed at Beaumont. 5th Corps was placed in reserve in the centre.

Moltke divided his forces into three groups: one to detain the French where they were, another to race forward and catch them if they retreated, and a third (the smallest force) to hold the river bank. The Saxon XII Corps crossed the Meuse to the Chiers, with the Prussian Guards on their right. The I Royal Bavarian Corps under General Baron von der Tann moved to Bazeilles and the Bavarian engineers deployed two pontoon bridges across the Meuse to secure their way across. The Prussian V and XI Corps completed the encirclement of the French army to the north-west by 0900 on 1 September.

== Battle ==
"Now we have them in the mousetrap."

— Helmuth von Moltke

The battle opened with the Army of Châlons, with 202 infantry battalions, 80 cavalry squadrons and 564 guns, attacking the surrounding Prussian Third and Fourth Armies, which totaled 222 infantry battalions, 186 cavalry squadrons, and 774 guns.

"We are in the chamber pot and about to be shat upon."

— Auguste-Alexandre Ducrot

Napoleon had ordered MacMahon to break out of the encirclement, and the only point where that seemed possible was La Moncelle, whose flank was protected by a fortified town. The Prussians also picked La Moncelle as one point where they would mount a breakthrough. Prince George of Saxony and the Prussian XI Corps was assigned to the task, and General Baron von der Tann was ordered to attack Bazeilles on the right flank.

This was the opening engagement, as the French 1st Corps had barricaded the streets, and enlisted the aid of the populace. Von der Tann sent a brigade across pontoon bridges at 04:00 in the early morning mist, the Bavarians rushing the village and capturing it through surprise. The French Marines of the 1st Corps fought back from stone houses and the Bavarian artillery shelled the buildings into rubble. The combat drew new forces, as French brigades from the 1st, 5th, and 12th Corps arrived. At 08:00 the Prussian 8th Infantry Division arrived, and von der Tann decided it was time for a decisive attack. He had not been able to bring artillery to bear from long range, so he committed his last brigade to storm the town, supported by artillery from the other side of the Meuse. His artillery reached Bazeilles at 09:00.

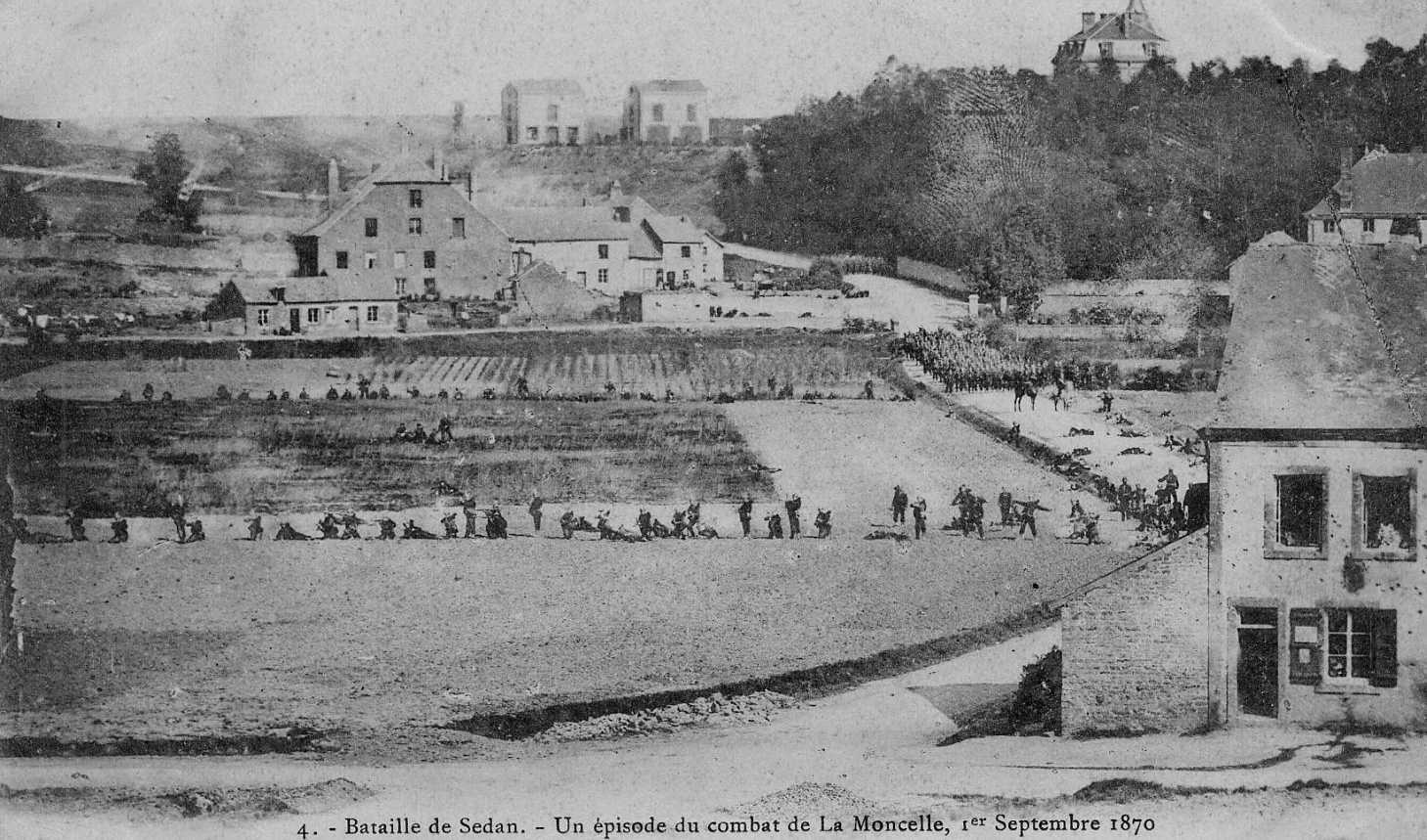
Photograph taken during the Battle of Sedan. Supposedly the first photograph ever taken of an active land battle

The fighting continued to spread to the south of the town, and the 8th Infantry Division was sent to reinforce the Bavarians fighting at La Moncelle, where they had tried to break through the French defense. Fighting began in earnest at 06:00, and the wounded MacMahon had appointed General Ducrot to command, who received the news at 07:00. Ducrot ordered the retreat that Moltke had expected, but was overruled almost immediately by General Wimpffen, who had been given a commission by the government to succeed MacMahon were he to become disabled. Wimpffen then threw his forces against the Saxons at La Moncelle. This led to a brief rally for the French, who drove back the artillery around La Moncelle and pressed the Bavarians and the Saxons. With the taking of Bazeilles at 08:00, and the arrival of fresh waves of Prussian troops, the counter-attack began to collapse.

By 11:00, Prussian artillery had taken a toll on the French, while more Prussian troops arrived on the battlefield. The Prussian V and XI Corps reached their designated positions to the west and north-west of the French army by 07:30 and 09:00, respectively. A French cavalry charge was defeated by Prussian infantry and artillery fire. The Prussian artillery batteries took up positions along slopes overlooking the French army.

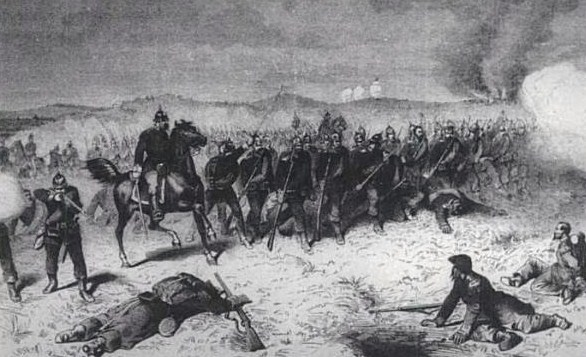
The Prussian Guards at the battle

German artillery fire on the French infantry and artillery and Prussian attacks from the northwest and east and Bavarian attacks from the southwest drove the Army of Châlons north into the Bois de la Garenne, where it was surrounded. Wimpffen at 13:00 gave orders for a breakout to the south. The attacks failed and Douay's 7th Corps front line was breached by German firepower. Douay's left flank had been dug in in two lines of trenches above Floing, their fire keeping the Germans from advancing from the village. By 13:00, the French artillery in that area had been defeated and the German 22nd Division turned Douay's left flank, defeating all counterattacks by French infantry and lancers. Ducrot directed General Jean Auguste Margueritte's cavalry squadrons to open an escape route by launching three attacks on the nearby village of Floing where the Prussian XI Corps was concentrated. Margueritte was mortally wounded leading the very first charge, and the two additional charges were defeated by German infantry fire at 15:00, the number of French killed and wounded amounting to 791.

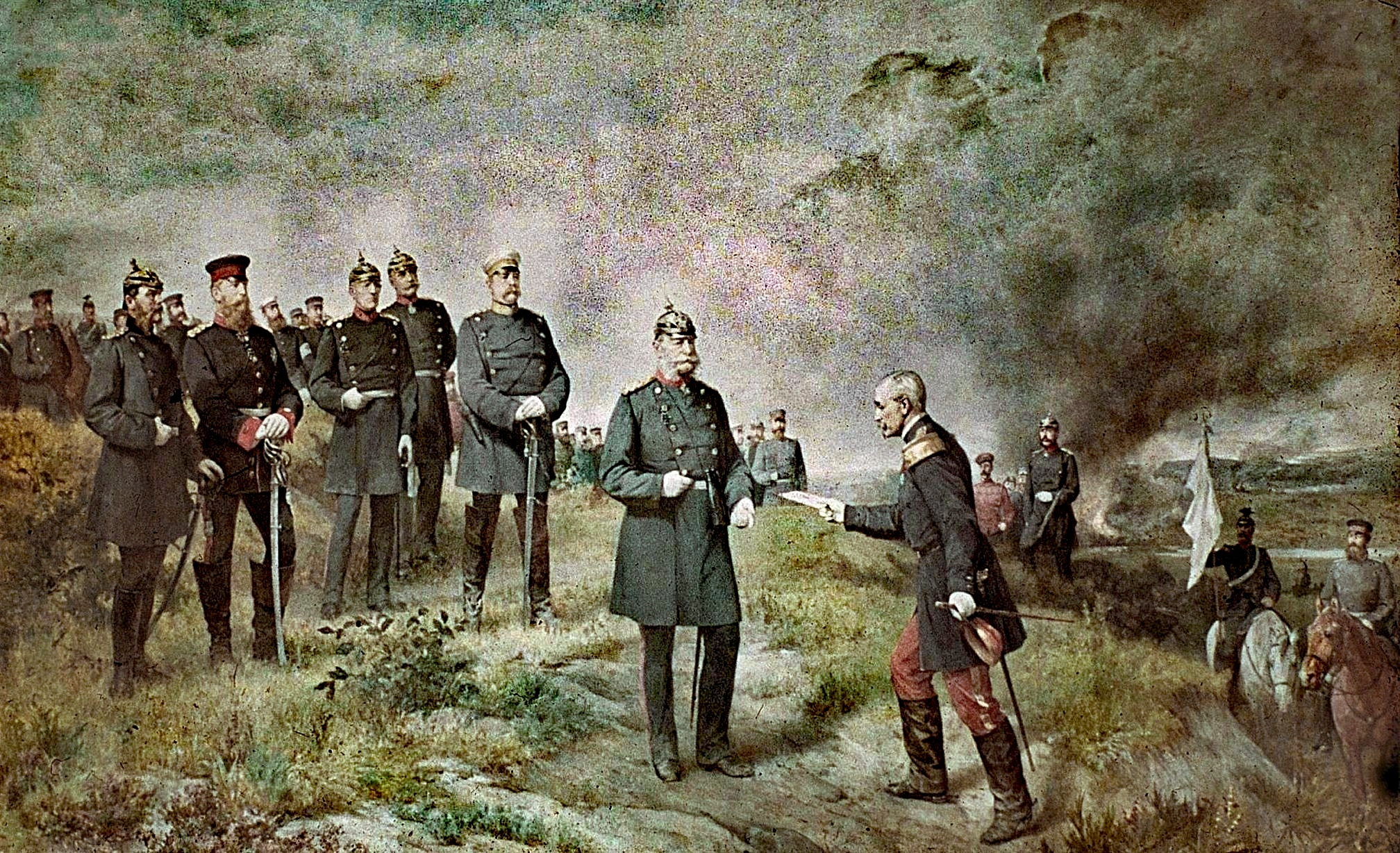
A mural painted in 1884 by Carl Steffeck depicts General Reille delivering Napoleon III's letter of surrender to King William I at the Battle of Sedan on 1 September 1870. It was kept at the former Ruhmeshalle in Berlin, before being destroyed by bombs during World War II.

By 14:00, the German infantry was on the Calvaire and fired on the French in the Bois de la Garenne. The Germans then attacked from all sides. The French 7th Corps under Douay broke, seeking refuge in the Bois de la Garenne or Sedan while fired upon by German artillery. Ducrot's 1st Corps was routed by the artillery of the Saxon XII Corps and the Prussian Guards Corps. The Bois de la Garenne was subject to German artillery fire from multiple sides and when the Prussian Guards infantry captured the forest at 14:30, the French troops inside it surrendered.

Seeking an end to the fighting, Napoleon III hoisted a white flag on the fortress walls of Sedan. Wimpffen saw the white flag but refused to surrender and launched one more attack, which was defeated by the Germans. Moltke, seeing the white flag, sent Bronsart von Schellendorf to find out its significance and Napoleon returned him with General André Charles Victor Reille to deliver a letter of surrender to the Prussian Royal Headquarters on the hillside above Frénois. Wilhelm and Bismarck read the letter and Bismarck accepted it. Wimpffen sought an "honorable capitulation" over prisoner-of-war status for the Army of Châlons, but Moltke rebuffed him, pointing to the French lack of ammunition and food, the 250,000 troops on the German side against the 80,000 fighting for the French and the surrounding German position. The truce was prolonged until 09:00 on 2 September.

== Aftermath ==
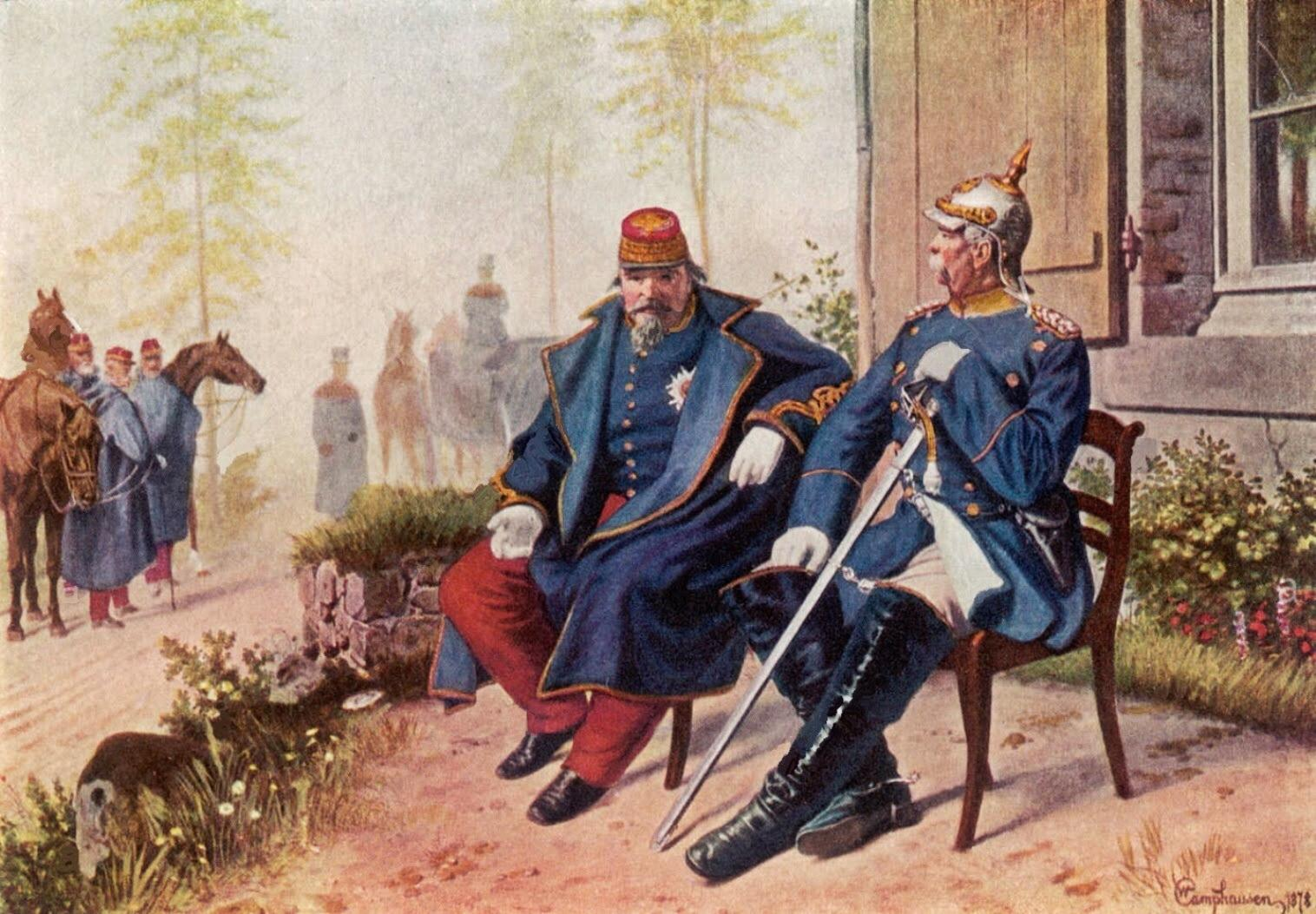
Napoleon III conversing with Otto von Bismarck after being captured in the Battle of Sedan (1878 painting by Wilhelm Camphausen)

By the next day, at 11:30 on 2 September, Wimpffen signed the surrender of the Army of Châlons and the fortress of Sedan. The French soldiers marched under heavy rain to an improvised German POW camp, where they starved for the next week. On 3 September, Napoleon III left for a comfortable captivity in Schloss Wilhelmshöhe near Kassel. The French prisoners of war viewed his departure with disinterest.

The capture of the French emperor left the Prussians without an opposing government willing to make a quick peace. Commenting on the difficult situation, two days after news hit Paris of Emperor Napoleon III's capture, his wife said, "Why didn't he kill himself?" The same day, a group of protesters stormed the Imperial palace and the Second French Empire collapsed in a bloodless revolution, leading to the creation of a Government of National Defense which would carry on the war for five more months before becoming the French Third Republic.

The defeat at Sedan and the capture of Napoleon III and France's second line army, and with the first line French Army shut up in Metz, sealed the doom of France, thus decided the outcome of the war in Prussia's favor. By 19 September, the Prussian Third and Fourth Armies went on to besiege Paris.

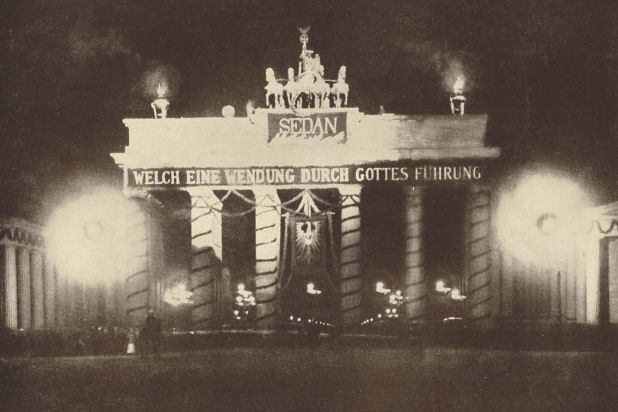
The Brandenburg Gate lit up on "Sedantag" in 1898. In English, the sign reads "What a change through God's guidance"

In recognition of the role this battle played in German Unification, many Germans celebrated Sedantag (Day of Sedan) on each 2 September until 1919. The Kaiser himself refused to declare 2 September an official holiday; instead, it became an unofficial day of celebration.

=== Casualties ===
The Germans suffered 9,860 casualties, with 1,310 men killed, 6,443 wounded and 2,107 missing. The French Army of Châlons suffered 3,220 killed, 14,811 wounded, and 104,000 captured, along with 558 guns. The French army lost 1,000 wagons and 6,000 horses to the Germans.

== See also ==
- Ceintures de Lyon
- The Last Cartridges
- Pascal Olivier Count de Negroni
- Paris Commune
- Emile Zola, La Debacle (Paris, 1892)

== Bibliography ==
- Clodfelter, M. (2017). Warfare and Armed Conflicts: A Statistical Encyclopedia of Casualty and Other Figures, 1492–2015 (4th ed.). Jefferson, North Carolina: McFarland. ISBN 978-0786474707.
- Grant, R. G. (2017). 1001 Battles That Changed the Course of History. Chartwell Books. ISBN 978-0785835530.
- Howard, M. (1961). The Franco-Prussian War: The German Invasion of France 1870–1871. London: Rupert Hart-Davis.
- Zuber, Terence (2008). The Moltke Myth: Prussian War Planning, 1857–1871. Lanham, Maryland: University Press of America. ISBN 978-0761841616.
