= André Charles Victor Reille =

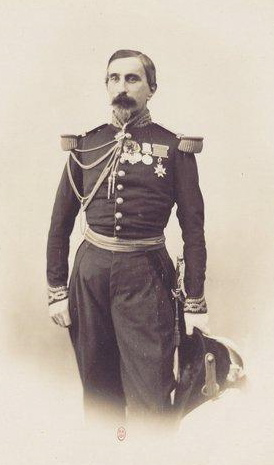
- Photographic portrait of Colonel Reille by Gustave Le Gray
- Born: July 23, 1815
- Died: January 15, 1887 (aged 71)
- Military career
- Allegiance: France
- Branch: French Army
- Rank: General
- Conflicts: Franco-Prussian War

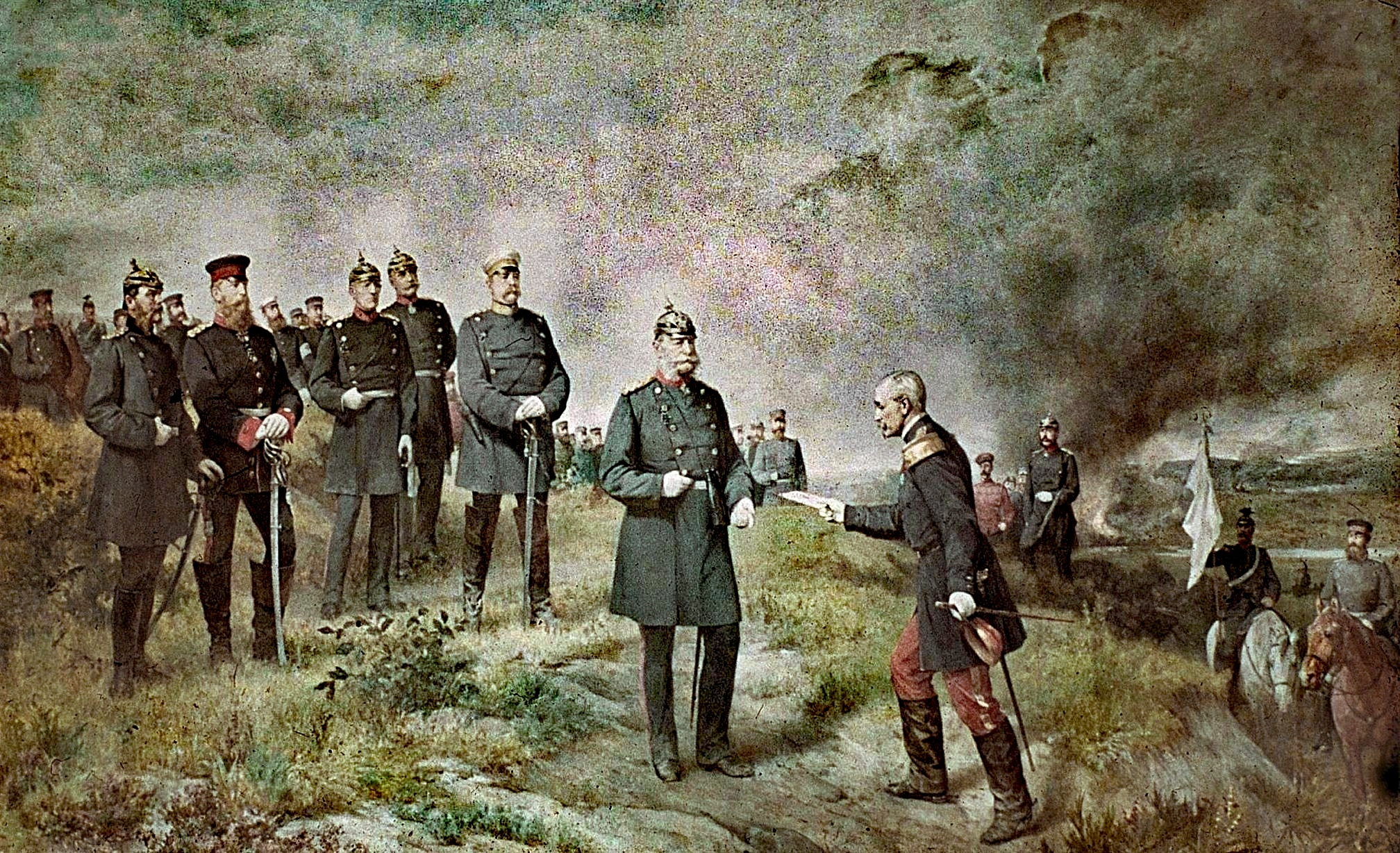
General Reille delivering Napoleon's letter of surrender to King William I at the Battle of Sedan in September 1870. Mural (1884) by Carl Steffeck for the former Ruhmeshalle in Berlin that was destroyed by bombs during World War II

André Charles Victor Reille (23 July 1815 in Paris – 19 January 1887 in Antibes) was a French general. Born into a military family, he studied at the Military School of Saint-Cyr and was a cavalry lieutenant by 1838, captain in 1841, before becoming an aide to General Oudinot, squadron leader in 1851, Lieutenant-Colonel in 1855, colonel in 1859, brigadier general in 1865, and major general in 1875. He was an aide to Napoleon III beginning in 1859 and gave Napoleon's letter of surrender to King William of Prussia at the Battle of Sedan in 1870.
