= Radvanice =

Radvanice may refer to places in the Czech Republic:

- Radvanice (Přerov District), a municipality and village in the Olomouc Region
- Radvanice (Trutnov District), a municipality and village in the Hradec Králové Region
- Radvanice, a village and part of Kobyly (Liberec District) in the Liberec Region
- Radvanice (Ostrava), a part of Ostrava
- Radvanice, a village and part of Úžice (Kutná Hora District) in the Central Bohemian Region
- Radvanice, a village and part of Velhartice in the Plzeň Region
