= Libňatov =

- Municipality
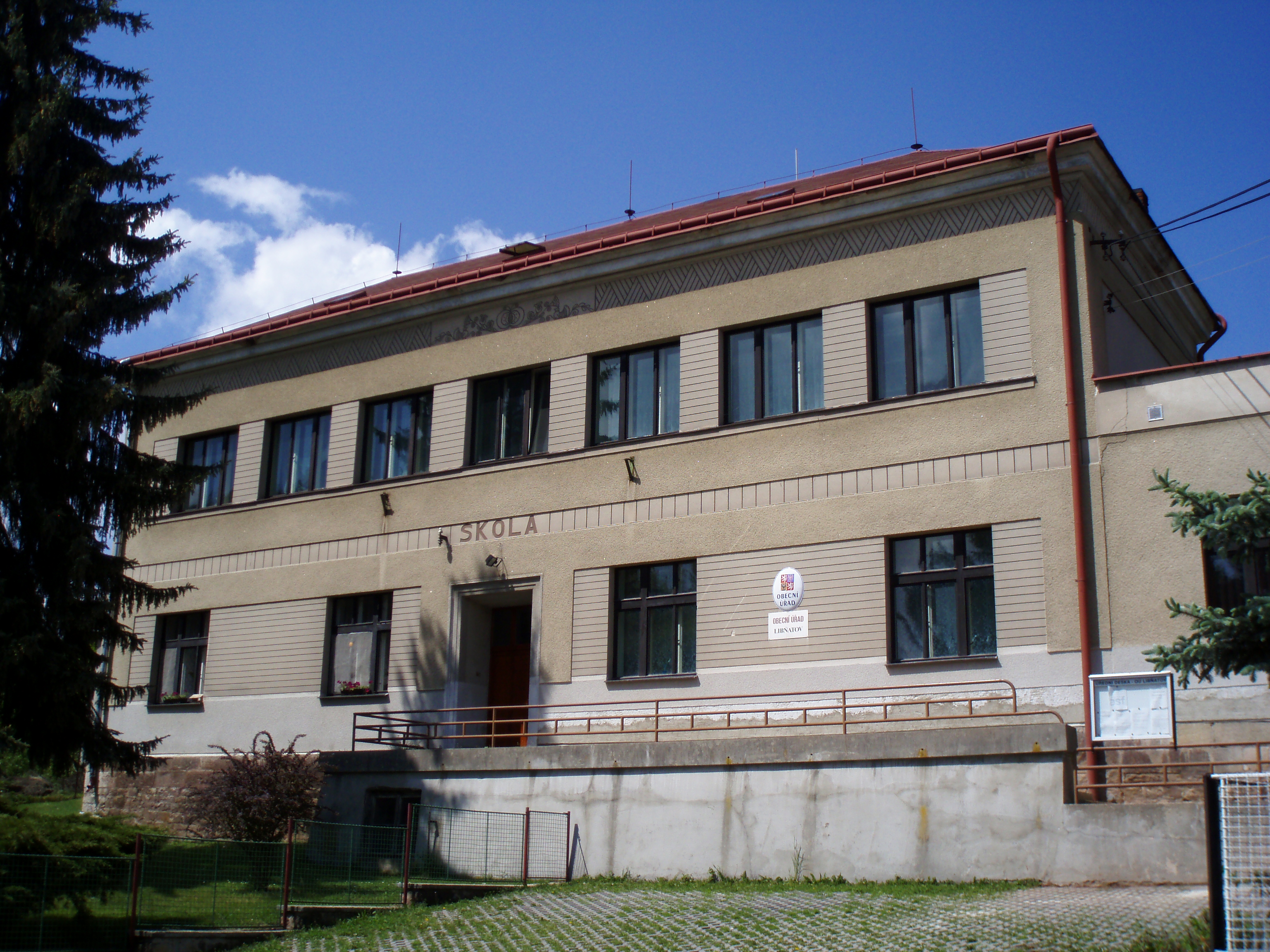
- Municipal office

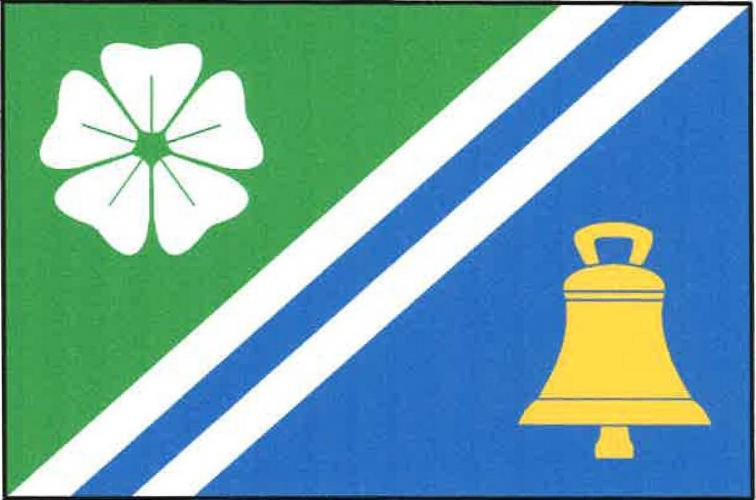
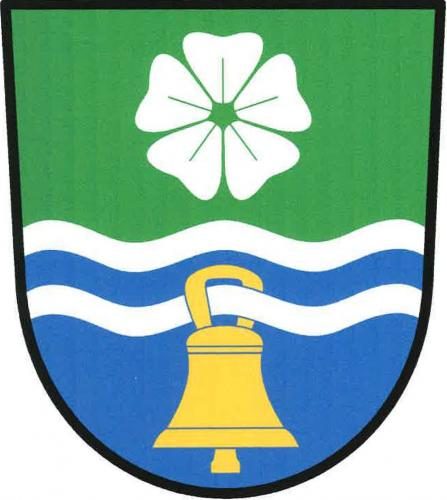
- Flag Coat of arms

- Location in the Czech Republic
- Coordinates: 50°28′53″N 16°0′8″E
- Country: Czech Republic
- Region: Hradec Králové
- District: Trutnov
- First mentioned: 1461

Area
  - Total: 5.82 km^{2} (2.25 sq mi)
- Elevation: 429 m (1,407 ft)

Population (2026-01-01)
  - Total: 425
  - Density: 73.0/km^{2} (189/sq mi)
- Time zone: UTC+1 (CET)
  - Summer (DST): UTC+2 (CEST)
- Postal code: 542 36
- Website: www.libnatov.cz

Libňatov (German: Liebental) is a municipality and village in Trutnov District in the Hradec Králové Region of the Czech Republic. It has about 400 inhabitants.

== History ==
The first written mention of Libňatov is from 1461.

== Demographics ==
Historical population
Year	Pop.	±%
1869	799	—
1880	820	+2.6%
1890	768	−6.3%
1900	730	−4.9%
1910	701	−4.0%
1921	594	−15.3%
1930	639	+7.6%
1950	490	−23.3%
1961	456	−6.9%
1970	423	−7.2%
1980	390	−7.8%
1991	375	−3.8%
2001	364	−2.9%
2011	353	−3.0%
2021	360	+2.0%
Source: Censuses
