= Stanovice (Trutnov District) =

- Municipality
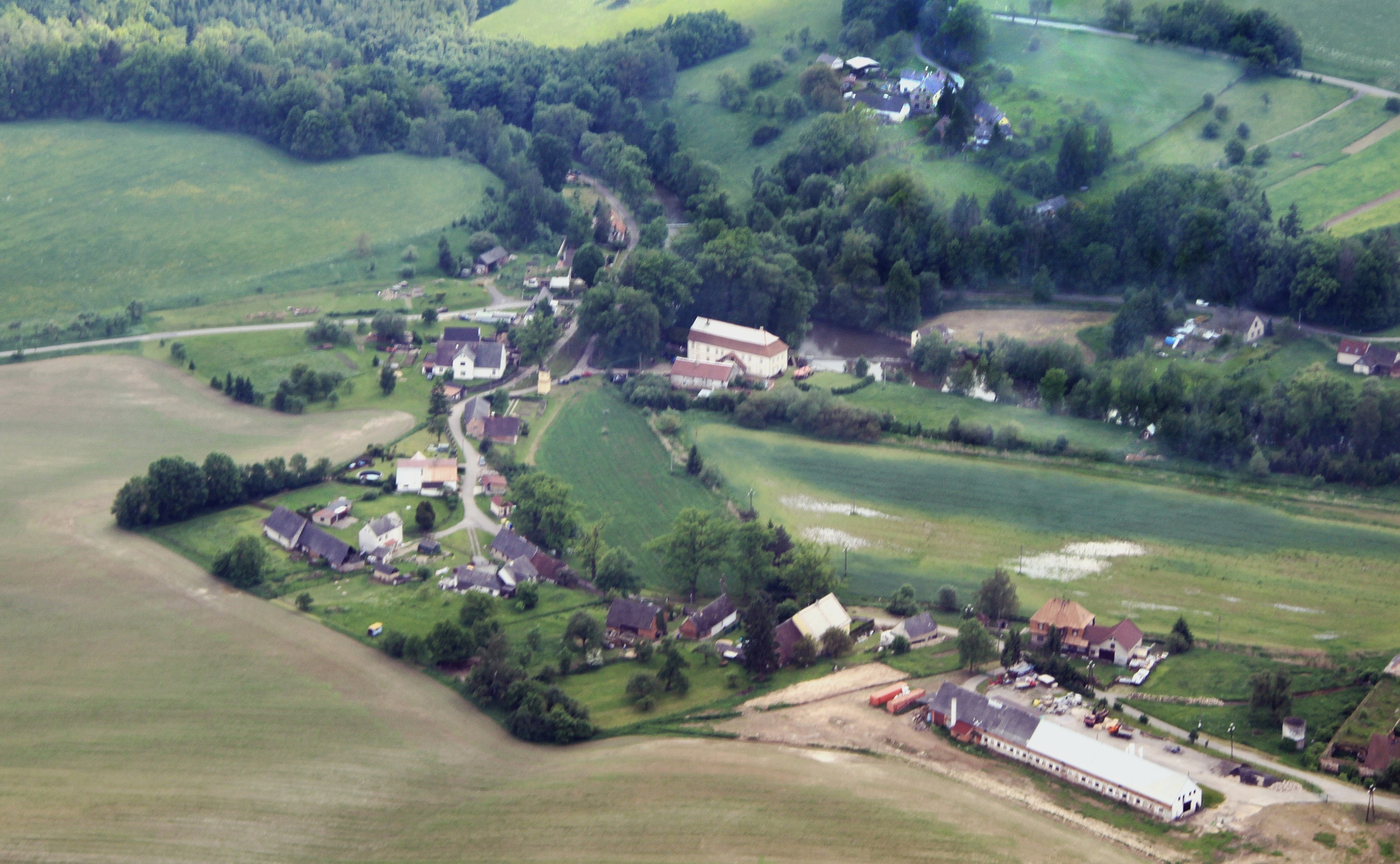
- Aerial view

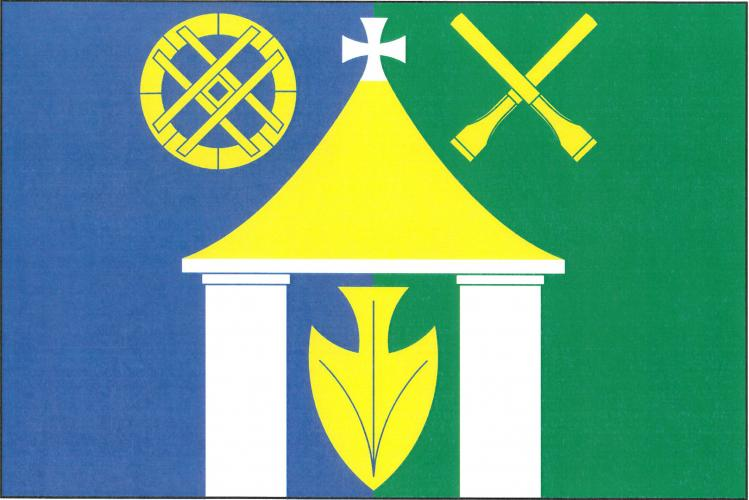
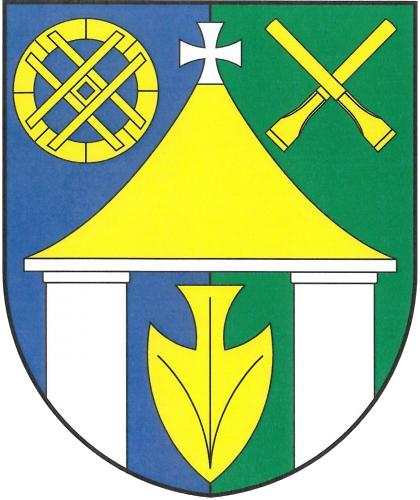
- Flag Coat of arms

- Location in the Czech Republic
- Coordinates: 50°24′2″N 15°52′17″E
- Country: Czech Republic
- Region: Hradec Králové
- District: Trutnov
- First mentioned: 1407

Area
  - Total: 2.70 km^{2} (1.04 sq mi)
- Elevation: 272 m (892 ft)

Population (2026-01-01)
  - Total: 58
  - Density: 21/km^{2} (56/sq mi)
- Time zone: UTC+1 (CET)
  - Summer (DST): UTC+2 (CEST)
- Postal code: 544 01
- Website: www.obec-stanovice.cz

Stanovice (German: Stangendorf) is a municipality and village in Trutnov District in the Hradec Králové Region of the Czech Republic. It has about 60 inhabitants.

== Demographics ==
Historical population
Year	Pop.	±%
1869	195	—
1880	201	+3.1%
1890	230	+14.4%
1900	194	−15.7%
1910	165	−14.9%
1921	186	+12.7%
1930	157	−15.6%
1950	137	−12.7%
1961	127	−7.3%
1970	125	−1.6%
1980	100	−20.0%
1991	75	−25.0%
2001	73	−2.7%
2011	57	−21.9%
2021	57	+0.0%
Source: Censuses
