= Batňovice =

- Municipality
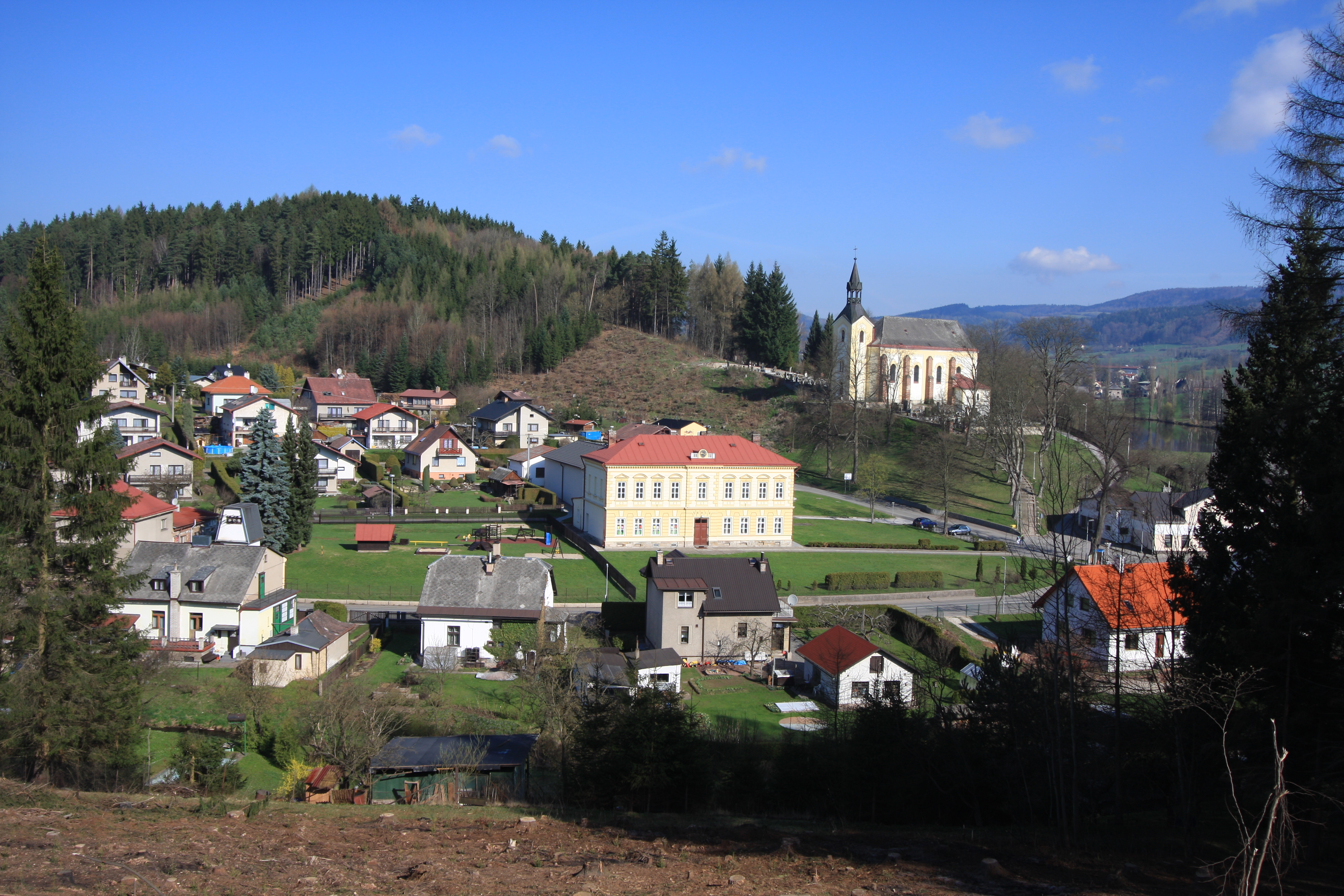
- School and Church of Saint Bartholomew

- Flag Coat of arms

- Location in the Czech Republic
- Coordinates: 50°31′3″N 16°2′12″E
- Country: Czech Republic
- Region: Hradec Králové
- District: Trutnov
- First mentioned: 1408

Area
  - Total: 4.47 km^{2} (1.73 sq mi)
- Elevation: 364 m (1,194 ft)

Population (2026-01-01)
  - Total: 787
  - Density: 176/km^{2} (456/sq mi)
- Time zone: UTC+1 (CET)
  - Summer (DST): UTC+2 (CEST)
- Postal code: 542 37
- Website: www.batnovice.cz

Batňovice is a municipality and village in Trutnov District in the Hradec Králové Region of the Czech Republic. It has about 800 inhabitants.

== History ==
The first written mention of Batňovice is from 1408.

== Demographics ==
Historical population
Year	Pop.	±%
1869	845	—
1880	986	+16.7%
1890	1,024	+3.9%
1900	1,111	+8.5%
1910	1,248	+12.3%
1921	1,063	−14.8%
1930	1,003	−5.6%
1950	891	−11.2%
1961	853	−4.3%
1970	864	+1.3%
1980	757	−12.4%
1991	675	−10.8%
2001	697	+3.3%
2011	723	+3.7%
2021	751	+3.9%
Source: Censuses
