= Trotina =

- Municipality
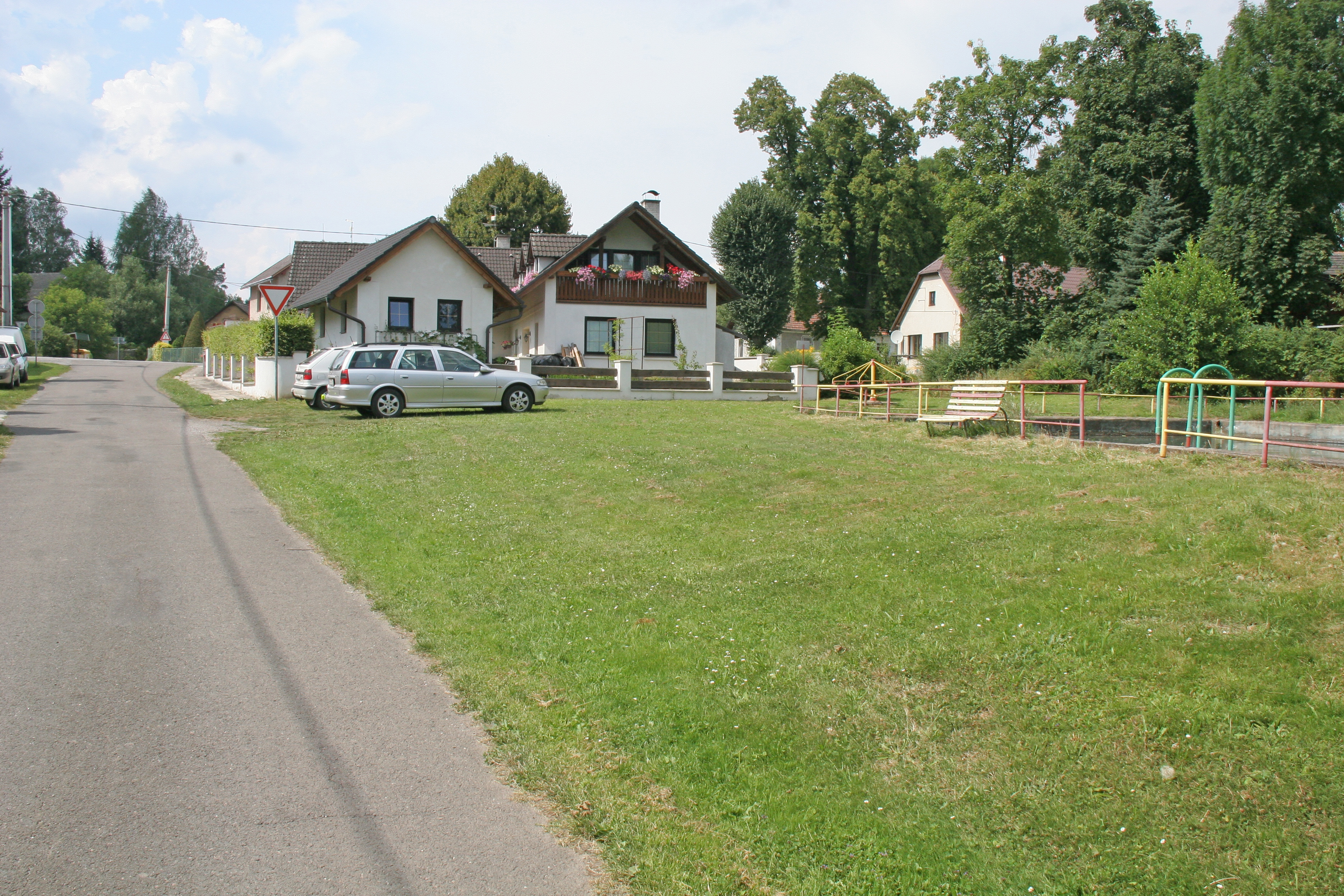
- Side street

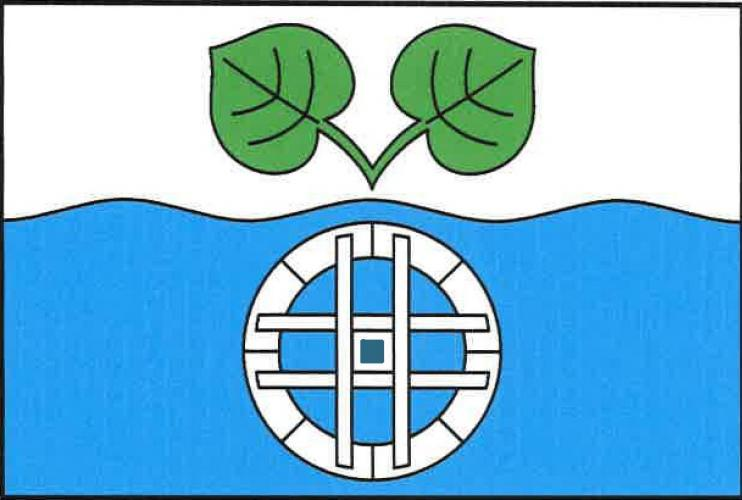
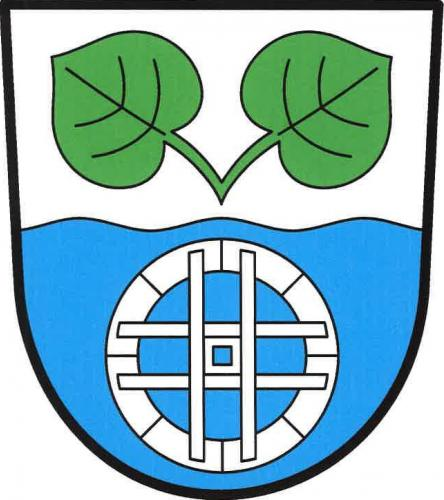
- Flag Coat of arms

- Location in the Czech Republic
- Coordinates: 50°24′35″N 15°42′59″E
- Country: Czech Republic
- Region: Hradec Králové
- District: Trutnov
- First mentioned: 1238

Area
  - Total: 1.58 km^{2} (0.61 sq mi)
- Elevation: 386 m (1,266 ft)

Population (2026-01-01)
  - Total: 99
  - Density: 63/km^{2} (160/sq mi)
- Time zone: UTC+1 (CET)
  - Summer (DST): UTC+2 (CEST)
- Postal code: 544 01
- Website: www.obec-trotina.cz

Trotina is a municipality and village in Trutnov District in the Hradec Králové Region of the Czech Republic. It has about 100 inhabitants.

== Demographics ==
Historical population
Year	Pop.	±%
1869	305	—
1880	276	−9.5%
1890	296	+7.2%
1900	278	−6.1%
1910	273	−1.8%
1921	238	−12.8%
1930	202	−15.1%
1950	138	−31.7%
1961	139	+0.7%
1970	95	−31.7%
1980	90	−5.3%
1991	85	−5.6%
2001	61	−28.2%
2011	78	+27.9%
2021	91	+16.7%
Source: Censuses
