= Hřibojedy =

- Municipality
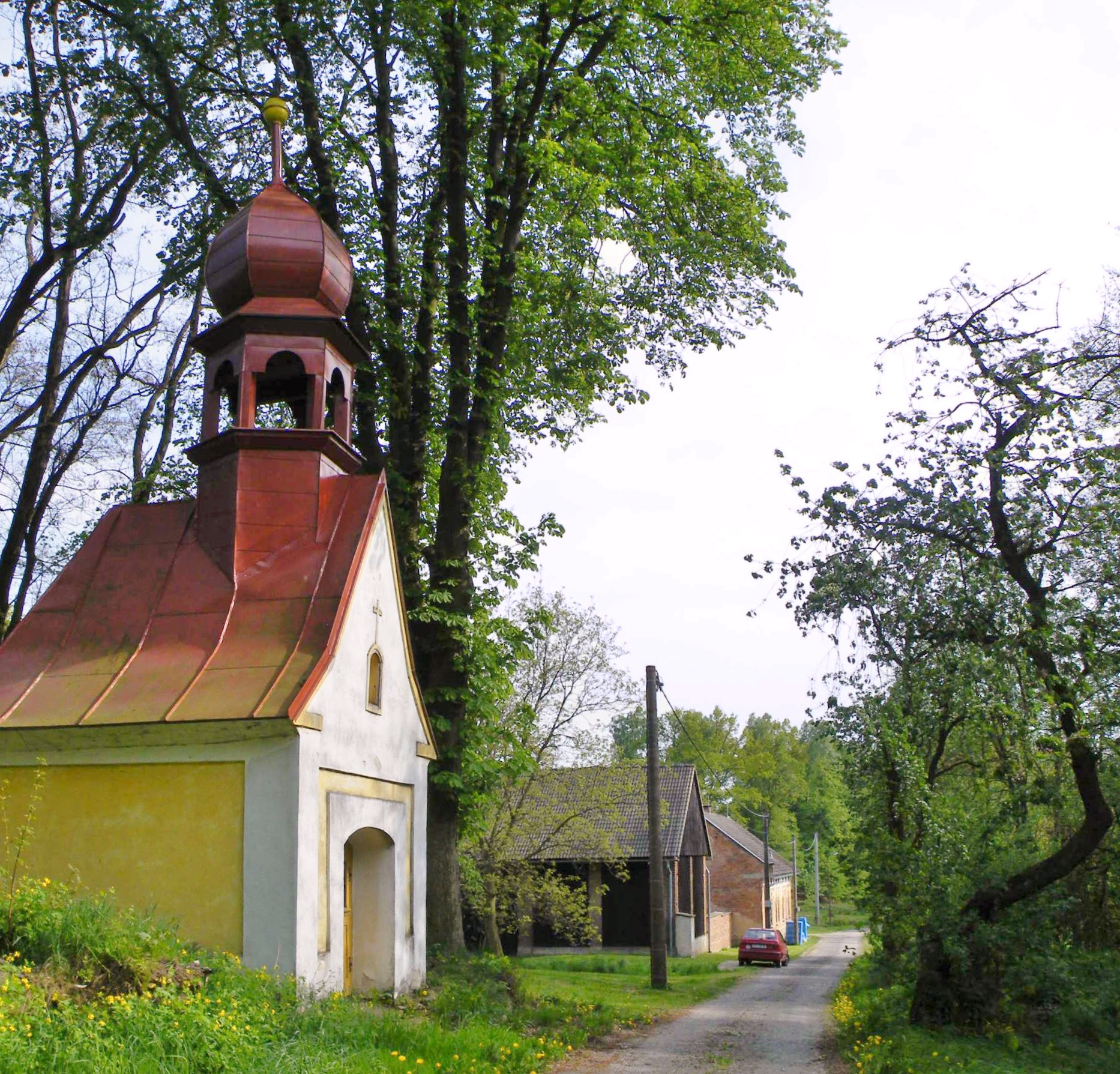
- Hvězda, a part of Hřibojedy

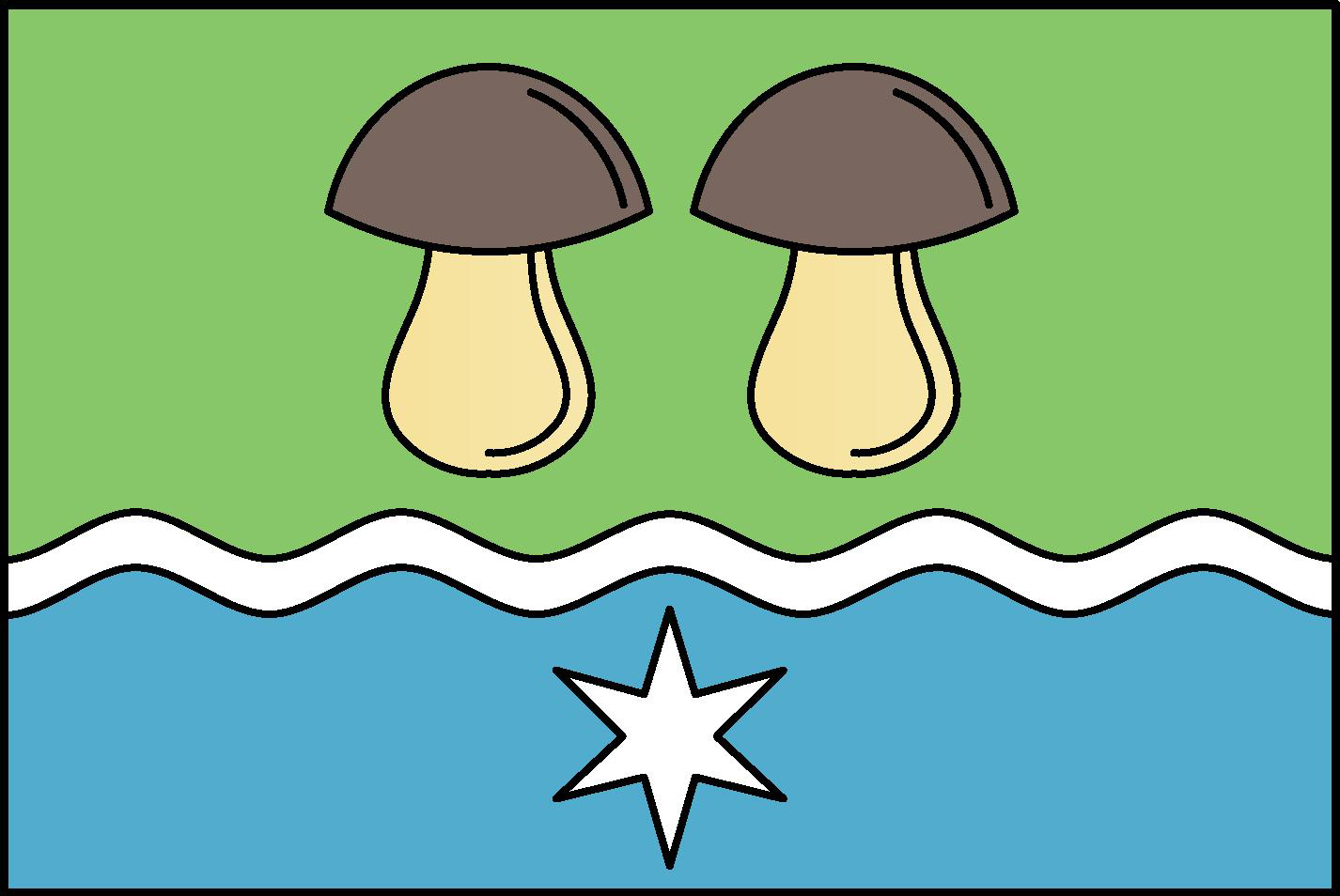
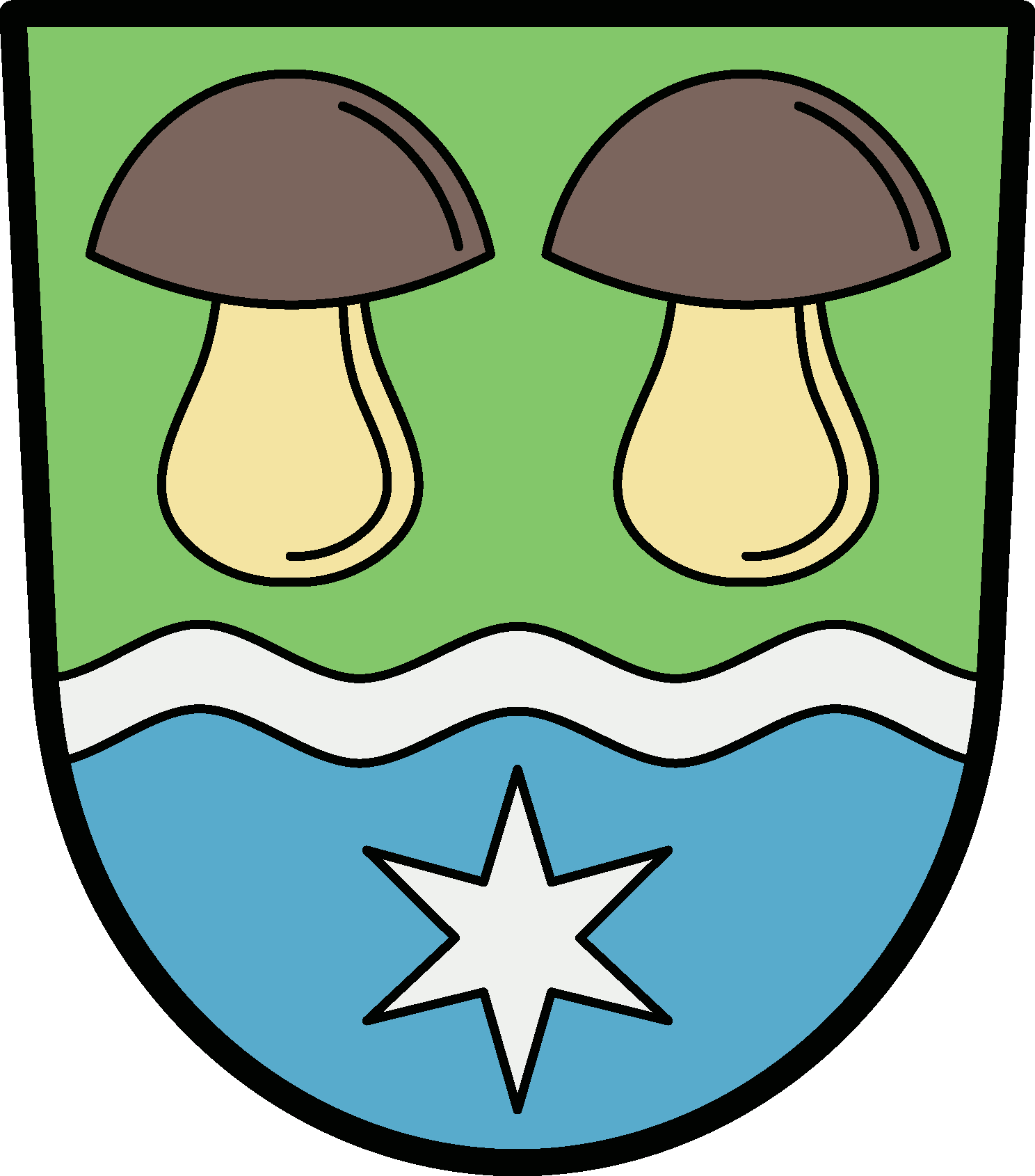
- Flag Coat of arms

- Location in the Czech Republic
- Coordinates: 50°23′32″N 15°50′5″E
- Country: Czech Republic
- Region: Hradec Králové
- District: Trutnov
- First mentioned: 1398

Area
  - Total: 5.70 km^{2} (2.20 sq mi)
- Elevation: 382 m (1,253 ft)

Population (2026-01-01)
  - Total: 227
  - Density: 39.8/km^{2} (103/sq mi)
- Time zone: UTC+1 (CET)
  - Summer (DST): UTC+2 (CEST)
- Postal code: 544 01
- Website: www.hribojedy.cz

Hřibojedy is a municipality and village in Trutnov District in the Hradec Králové Region of the Czech Republic. It has about 200 inhabitants.

== Administrative division ==
Hřibojedy consists of two municipal parts (in brackets population according to the 2021 census):

- Hřibojedy (168)
- Hvězda (39)

== Demographics ==
Historical population
| Year | Pop. | ±% |
|---|---|---|
| 1869 | 501 | — |
| 1880 | 545 | +8.8% |
| 1890 | 473 | −13.2% |
| 1900 | 398 | −15.9% |
| 1910 | 394 | −1.0% |
| 1921 | 401 | +1.8% |
| 1930 | 381 | −5.0% |
| 1950 | 329 | −13.6% |
| 1961 | 300 | −8.8% |
| 1970 | 279 | −7.0% |
| 1980 | 273 | −2.2% |
| 1991 | 213 | −22.0% |
| 2001 | 206 | −3.3% |
| 2011 | 200 | −2.9% |
| 2021 | 207 | +3.5% |
Source: Censuses
