= Staré Buky =

- Municipality
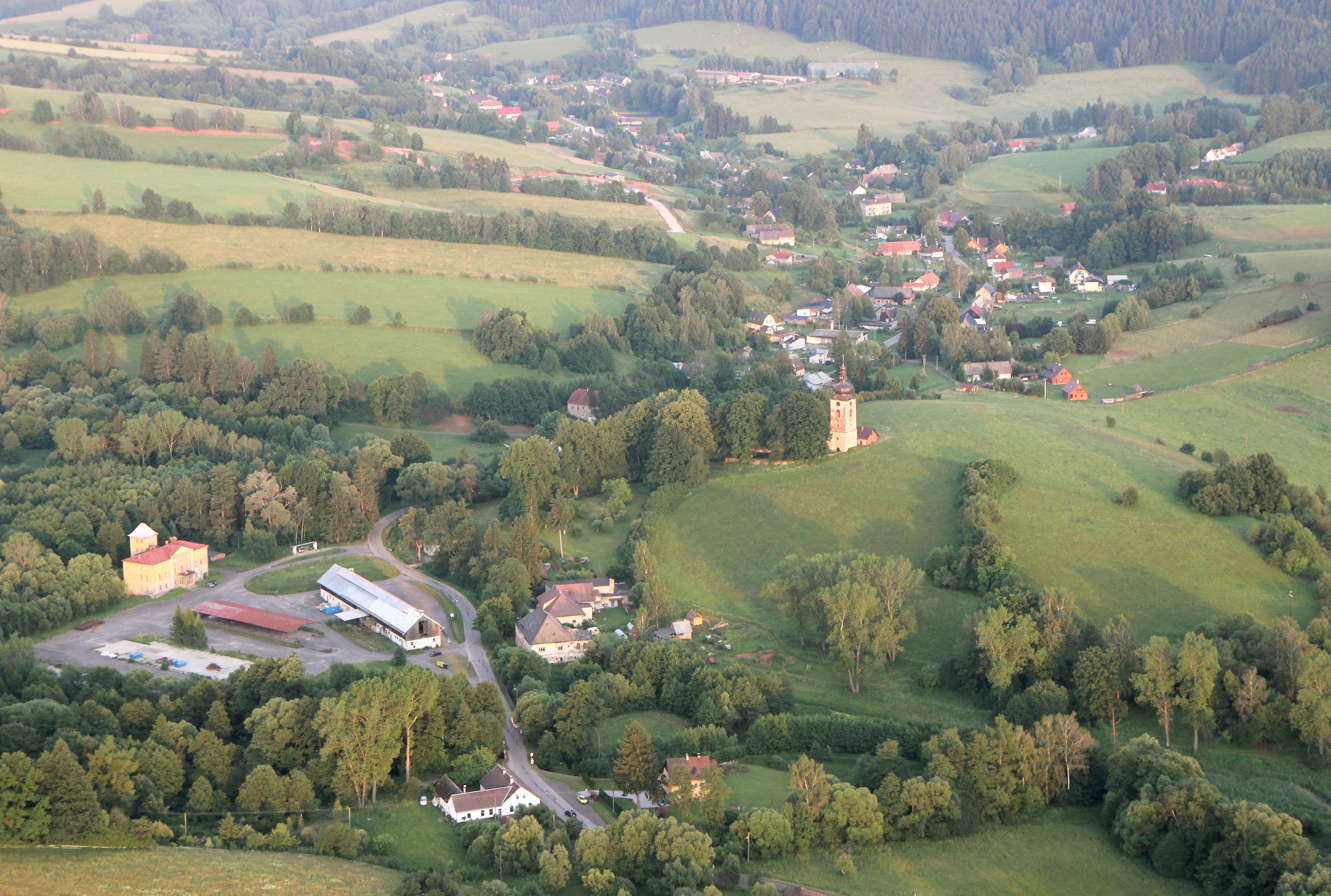
- Aerial view

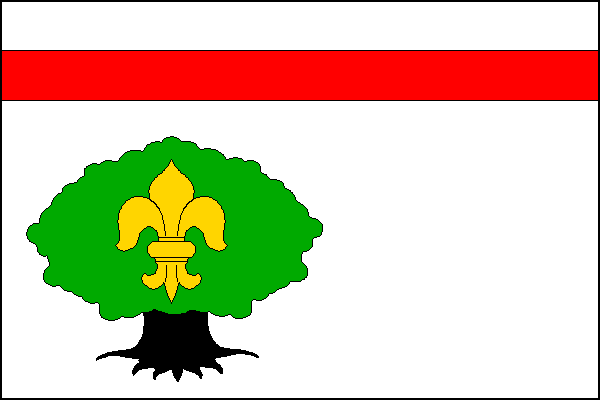
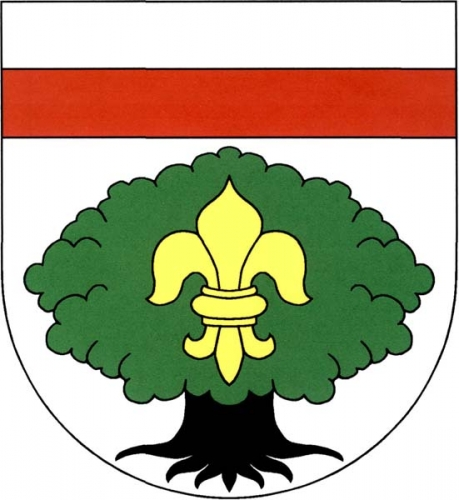
- Flag Coat of arms

- Location in the Czech Republic
- Coordinates: 50°32′15″N 15°50′54″E
- Country: Czech Republic
- Region: Hradec Králové
- District: Trutnov
- First mentioned: 1355

Area
  - Total: 17.89 km^{2} (6.91 sq mi)
- Elevation: 374 m (1,227 ft)

Population (2026-01-01)
  - Total: 675
  - Density: 37.7/km^{2} (97.7/sq mi)
- Time zone: UTC+1 (CET)
  - Summer (DST): UTC+2 (CEST)
- Postal code: 542 43
- Website: www.starebuky.cz

Staré Buky (German: Altenbuch) is a municipality and village in Trutnov District in the Hradec Králové Region of the Czech Republic. It has about 700 inhabitants.

== Administrative division ==
Staré Buky consists of two municipal parts (in brackets population according to the 2021 census):

- Dolní Staré Buky (125)
- Horní Staré Buky (162)
- Prostřední Staré Buky (325)

== Demographics ==
Historical population
Year	Pop.	±%
1869	2,049	—
1880	1,816	−11.4%
1890	1,690	−6.9%
1900	1,676	−0.8%
1910	1,564	−6.7%
1921	1,390	−11.1%
1930	1,350	−2.9%
1950	667	−50.6%
1961	608	−8.8%
1970	503	−17.3%
1980	432	−14.1%
1991	356	−17.6%
2001	383	+7.6%
2011	491	+28.2%
2021	612	+24.6%
Source: Censuses

== Notable people ==
- Adolf Prokop (1939–2026), football referee
