= Chotěvice =

- Municipality
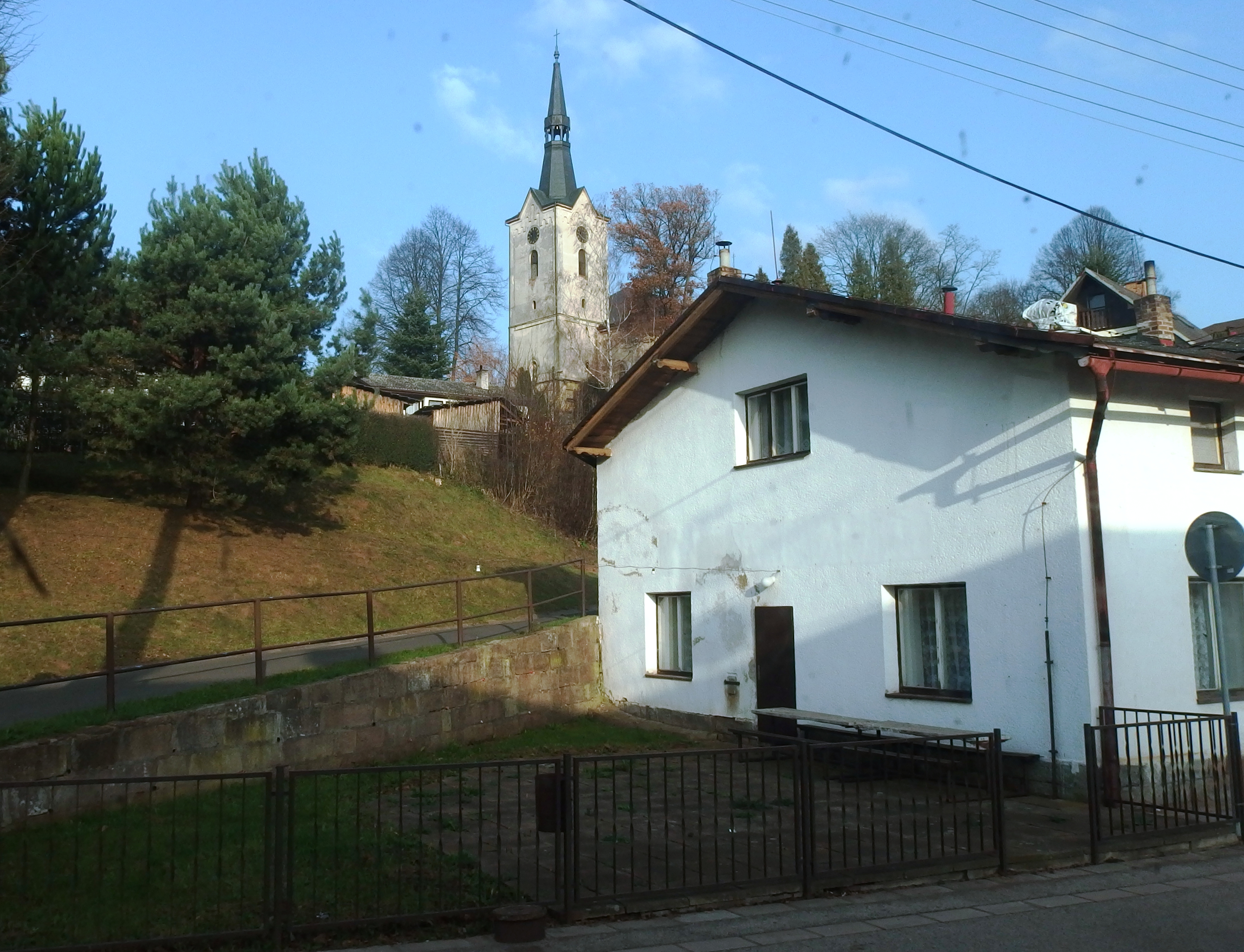
- Church of Saints Peter and Paul

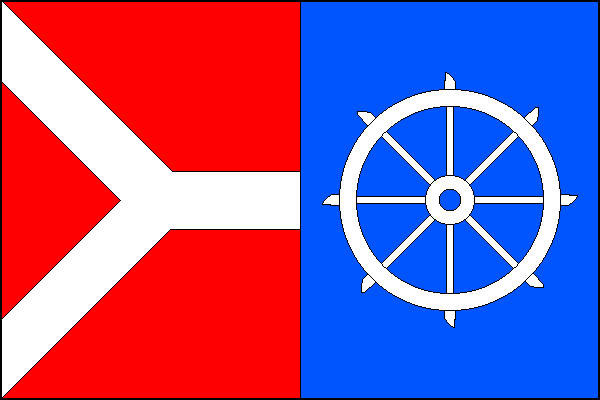
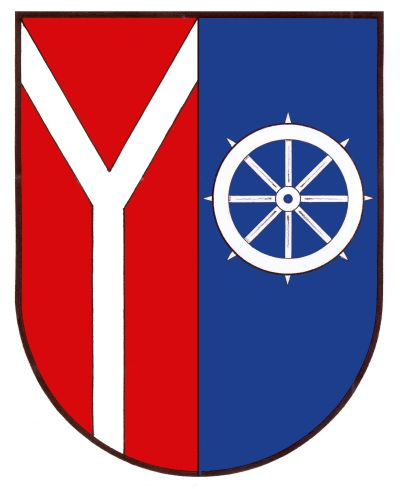
- Flag Coat of arms

- Location in the Czech Republic
- Coordinates: 50°31′17″N 15°46′0″E
- Country: Czech Republic
- Region: Hradec Králové
- District: Trutnov
- First mentioned: 1362

Area
  - Total: 20.13 km^{2} (7.77 sq mi)
- Elevation: 357 m (1,171 ft)

Population (2026-01-01)
  - Total: 1,046
  - Density: 51.96/km^{2} (134.6/sq mi)
- Time zone: UTC+1 (CET)
  - Summer (DST): UTC+2 (CEST)
- Postal code: 543 76
- Website: www.chotevice.cz

Chotěvice (German: Kottwitz) is a municipality and village in Trutnov District in the Hradec Králové Region of the Czech Republic. It has about 1,000 inhabitants.

== Demographics ==
Historical population
Year	Pop.	±%
1869	1,689	—
1880	1,665	−1.4%
1890	1,685	+1.2%
1900	1,693	+0.5%
1910	1,746	+3.1%
1921	1,730	−0.9%
1930	1,785	+3.2%
1950	1,395	−21.8%
1961	1,364	−2.2%
1970	1,251	−8.3%
1980	1,088	−13.0%
1991	975	−10.4%
2001	978	+0.3%
2011	977	−0.1%
2021	961	−1.6%
Source: Censuses
