= Libotov =

- Municipality
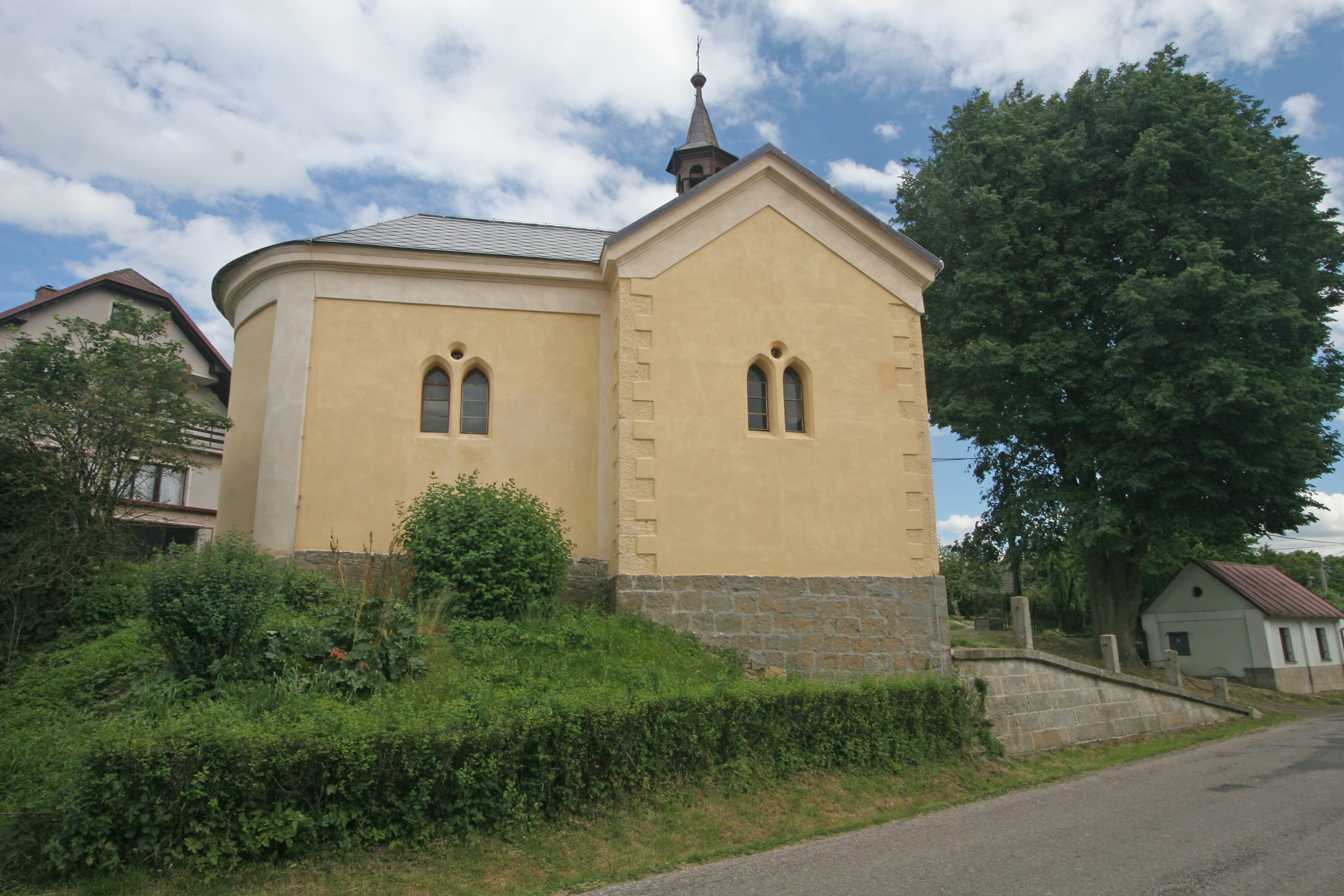
- Chapel of Our Lady of Sorrows

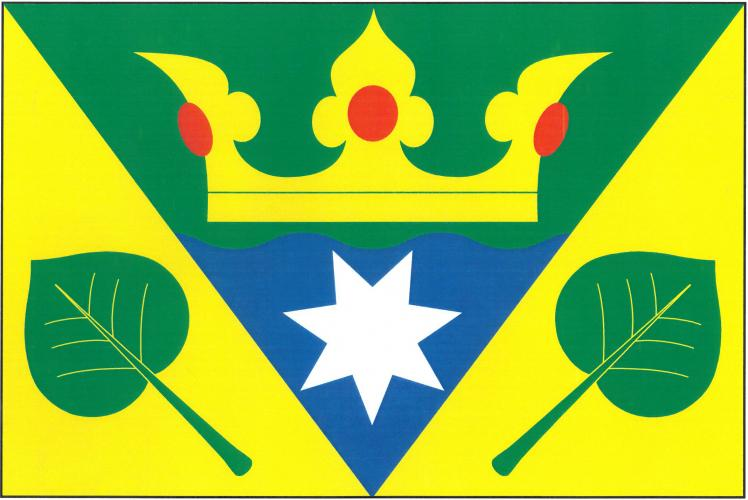
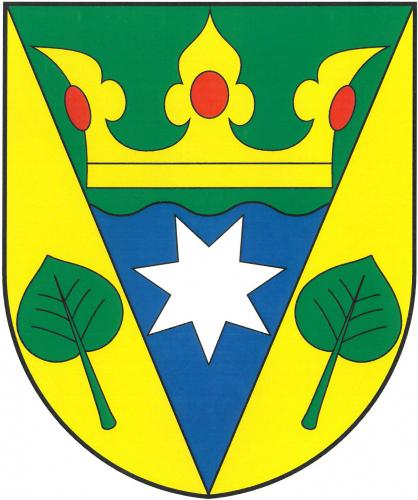
- Flag Coat of arms

- Location in the Czech Republic
- Coordinates: 50°23′57″N 15°48′42″E
- Country: Czech Republic
- Region: Hradec Králové
- District: Trutnov
- First mentioned: 1289

Area
  - Total: 4.24 km^{2} (1.64 sq mi)
- Elevation: 399 m (1,309 ft)

Population (2026-01-01)
  - Total: 179
  - Density: 42.2/km^{2} (109/sq mi)
- Time zone: UTC+1 (CET)
  - Summer (DST): UTC+2 (CEST)
- Postal code: 544 01
- Website: www.libotov.cz

Libotov (German: Liebthal) is a municipality and village in Trutnov District in the Hradec Králové Region of the Czech Republic. It has about 200 inhabitants.

== Demographics ==
Historical population
Year	Pop.	±%
1869	446	—
1880	433	−2.9%
1890	380	−12.2%
1900	362	−4.7%
1910	385	+6.4%
1921	390	+1.3%
1930	370	−5.1%
1950	249	−32.7%
1961	260	+4.4%
1970	216	−16.9%
1980	193	−10.6%
1991	161	−16.6%
2001	167	+3.7%
2011	171	+2.4%
2021	159	−7.0%
Source: Censuses
