= Zábřezí-Řečice =

- Municipality
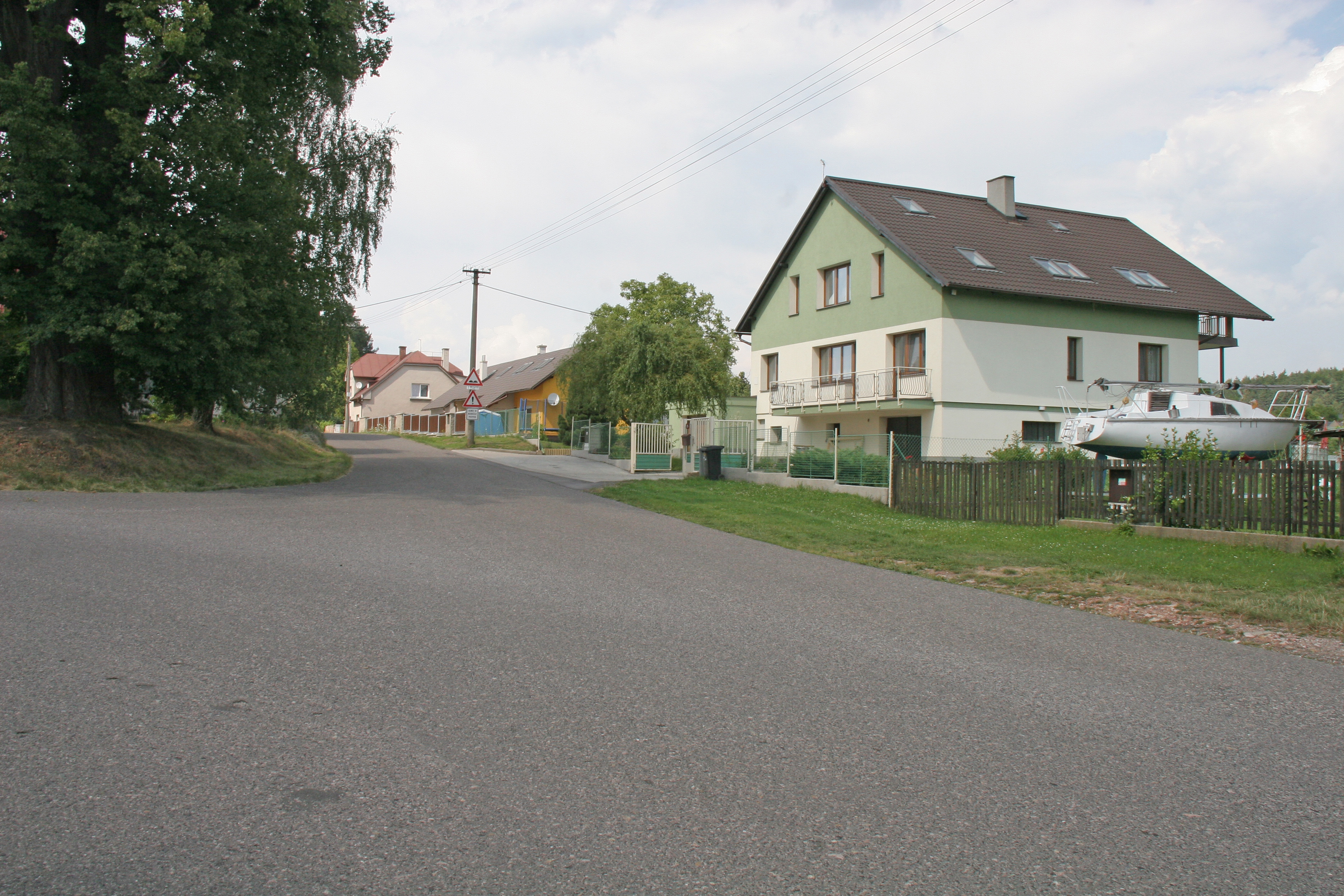
- Crossroads in Zábřezí

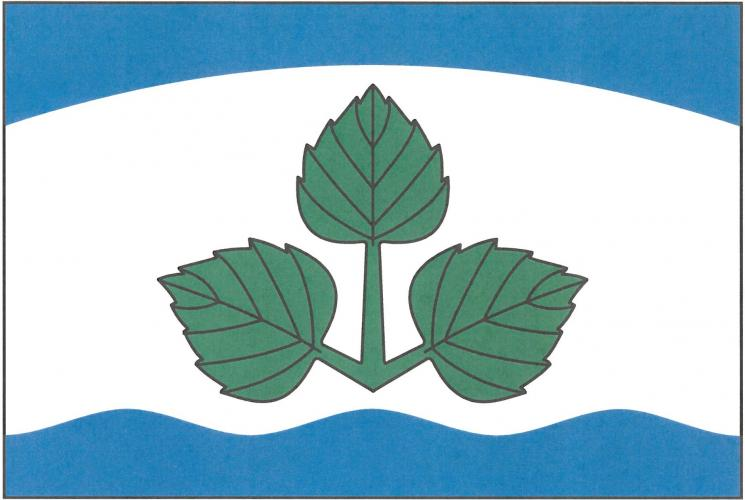
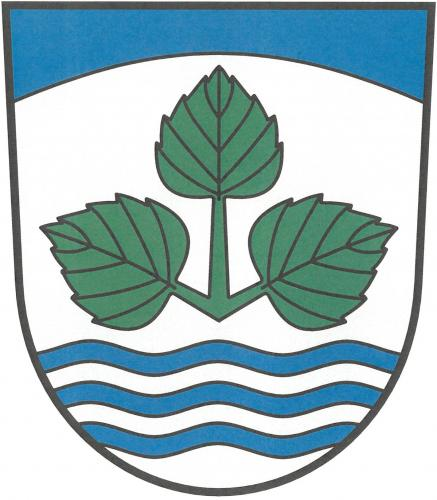
- Flag Coat of arms

- Location in the Czech Republic
- Coordinates: 50°24′39″N 15°44′11″E
- Country: Czech Republic
- Region: Hradec Králové
- District: Trutnov
- First mentioned: 1238

Area
  - Total: 2.45 km^{2} (0.95 sq mi)
- Elevation: 414 m (1,358 ft)

Population (2026-01-01)
  - Total: 148
  - Density: 60.4/km^{2} (156/sq mi)
- Time zone: UTC+1 (CET)
  - Summer (DST): UTC+2 (CEST)
- Postal code: 544 01
- Website: www.zabrezi-recice.cz

Zábřezí-Řečice is a municipality in Trutnov District in the Hradec Králové Region of the Czech Republic. It has about 100 inhabitants.

== Administrative division ==
Zábřezí-Řečice consists of two municipal parts (in brackets population according to the 2021 census):

- Zábřezí (82)
- Řečice (55)

== Demographics ==
Historical population
Year	Pop.	±%
1869	307	—
1880	276	−10.1%
1890	301	+9.1%
1900	270	−10.3%
1910	250	−7.4%
1921	261	+4.4%
1930	249	−4.6%
1950	184	−26.1%
1961	206	+12.0%
1970	162	−21.4%
1980	151	−6.8%
1991	133	−11.9%
2001	142	+6.8%
2011	143	+0.7%
2021	137	−4.2%
Source: Censuses
