= Nemojov =

- Municipality
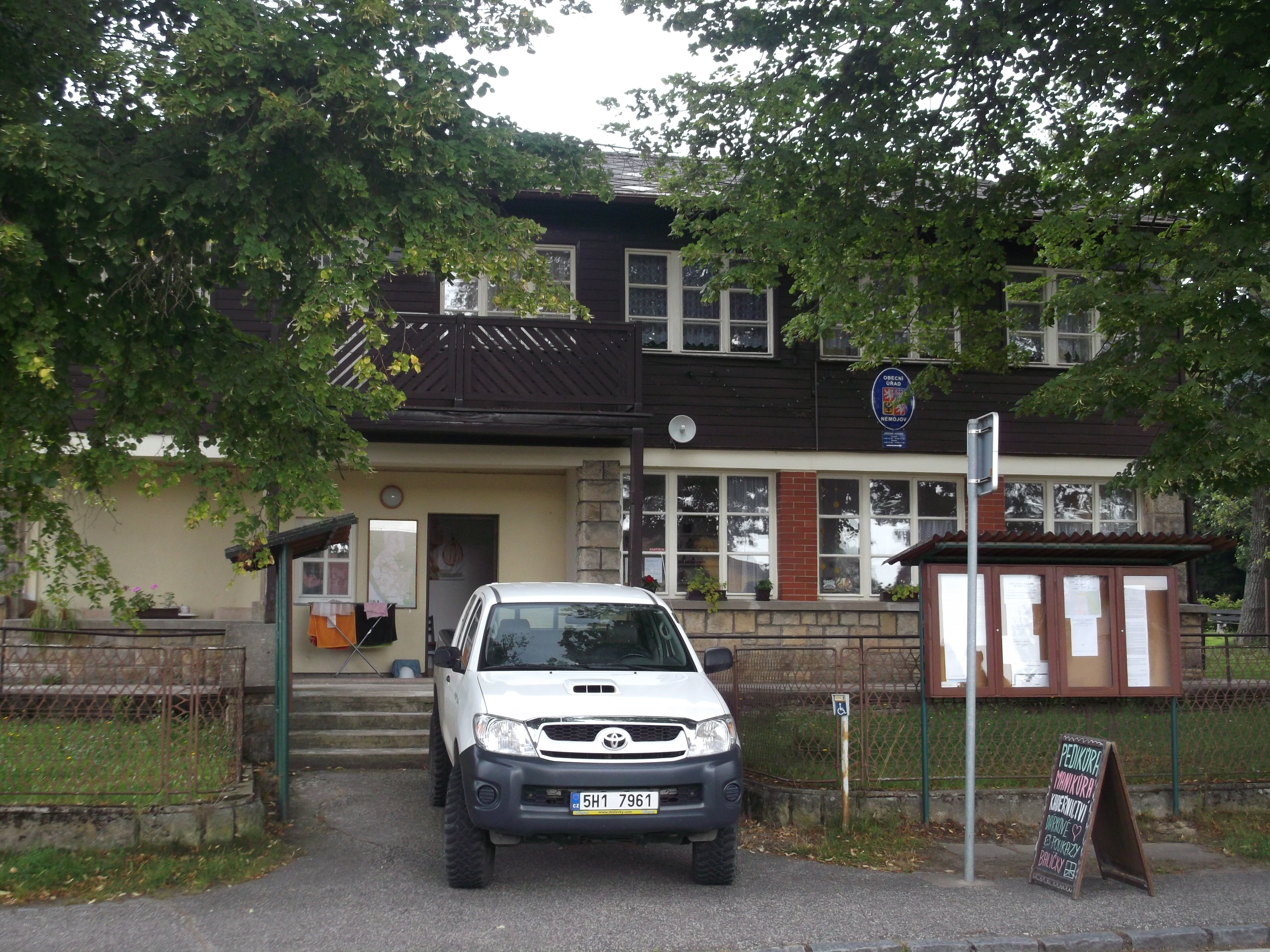
- Municipal office

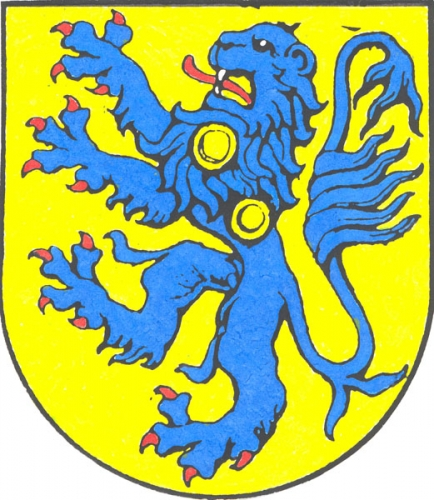
- Flag Coat of arms

- Location in the Czech Republic
- Coordinates: 50°27′58″N 15°45′18″E
- Country: Czech Republic
- Region: Hradec Králové
- District: Trutnov
- First mentioned: 1528

Area
  - Total: 8.14 km^{2} (3.14 sq mi)
- Elevation: 391 m (1,283 ft)

Population (2026-01-01)
  - Total: 831
  - Density: 102/km^{2} (264/sq mi)
- Time zone: UTC+1 (CET)
  - Summer (DST): UTC+2 (CEST)
- Postal code: 544 61
- Website: nemojov.com

Nemojov is a municipality and village in Trutnov District in the Hradec Králové Region of the Czech Republic. It has about 800 inhabitants.

== Administrative division ==
Nemojov consists of four municipal parts (in brackets population according to the 2021 census):

- Dolní Nemojov (417)
- Horní Nemojov (121)
- Nový Nemojov (81)
- Starobucké Debrné (168)

== Demographics ==
Historical population
Year	Pop.	±%
1869	1,400	—
1880	1,366	−2.4%
1890	1,212	−11.3%
1900	1,060	−12.5%
1910	1,244	+17.4%
1921	925	−25.6%
1930	951	+2.8%
1950	531	−44.2%
1961	552	+4.0%
1970	542	−1.8%
1980	503	−7.2%
1991	439	−12.7%
2001	492	+12.1%
2011	639	+29.9%
2021	787	+23.2%
Source: Censuses
