= Maršov u Úpice =

- Municipality
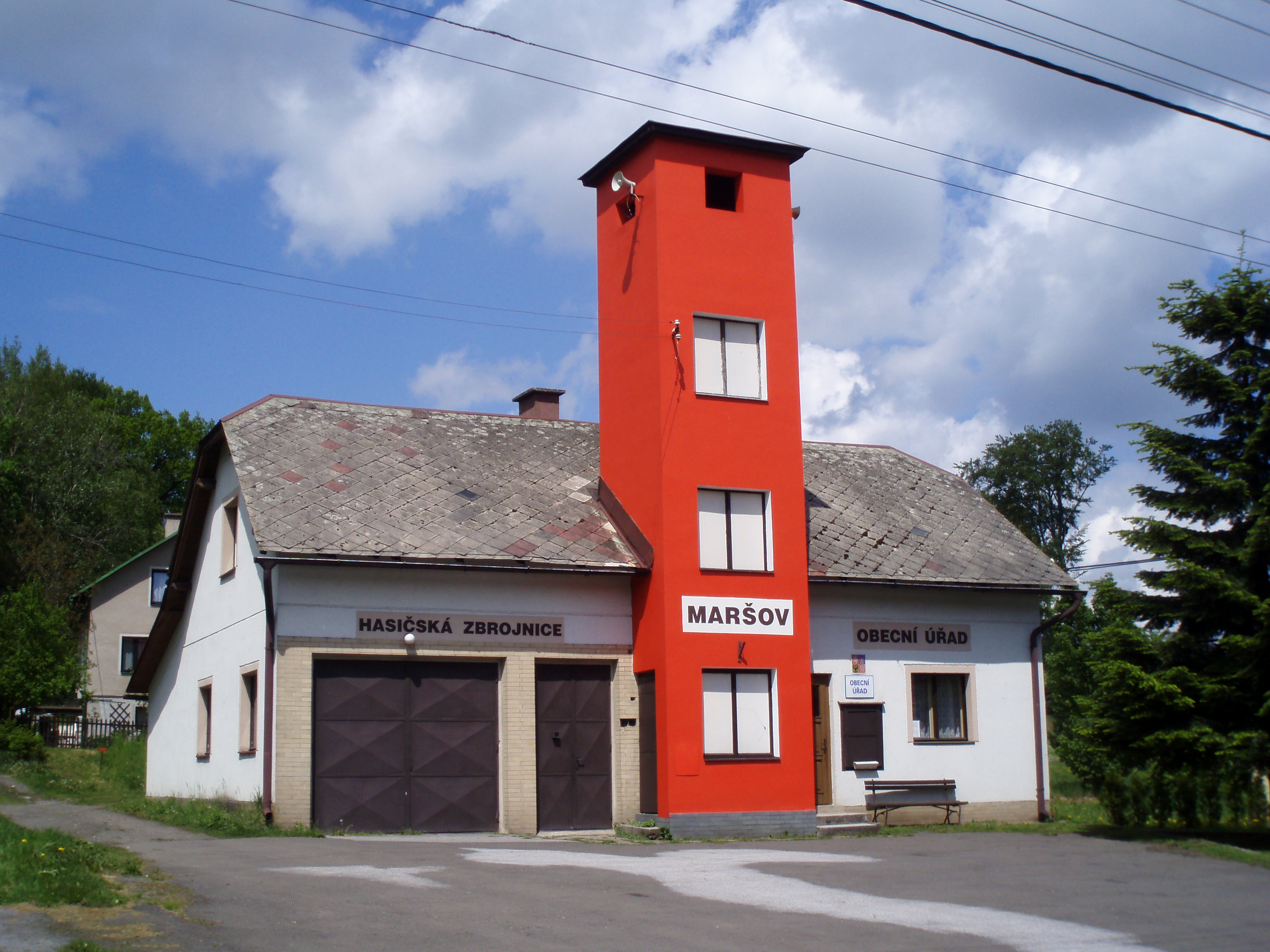
- Municipal office

- Flag Coat of arms

- Location in the Czech Republic
- Coordinates: 50°29′4″N 15°58′34″E
- Country: Czech Republic
- Region: Hradec Králové
- District: Trutnov
- First mentioned: 1495

Area
  - Total: 3.31 km^{2} (1.28 sq mi)
- Elevation: 462 m (1,516 ft)

Population (2026-01-01)
  - Total: 188
  - Density: 56.8/km^{2} (147/sq mi)
- Time zone: UTC+1 (CET)
  - Summer (DST): UTC+2 (CEST)
- Postal code: 542 32
- Website: www.obecmarsov.cz

Maršov u Úpice is a municipality and village in Trutnov District in the Hradec Králové Region of the Czech Republic. It has about 200 inhabitants.

== History ==
The first written mention of Maršov is from 1495.

== Demographics ==
Historical population
Year	Pop.	±%
1869	415	—
1880	375	−9.6%
1890	378	+0.8%
1900	369	−2.4%
1910	358	−3.0%
1921	322	−10.1%
1930	311	−3.4%
1950	216	−30.5%
1961	218	+0.9%
1970	206	−5.5%
1980	182	−11.7%
1991	146	−19.8%
2001	155	+6.2%
2011	164	+5.8%
2021	171	+4.3%
Source: Censuses
