= Suchovršice =

- Municipality
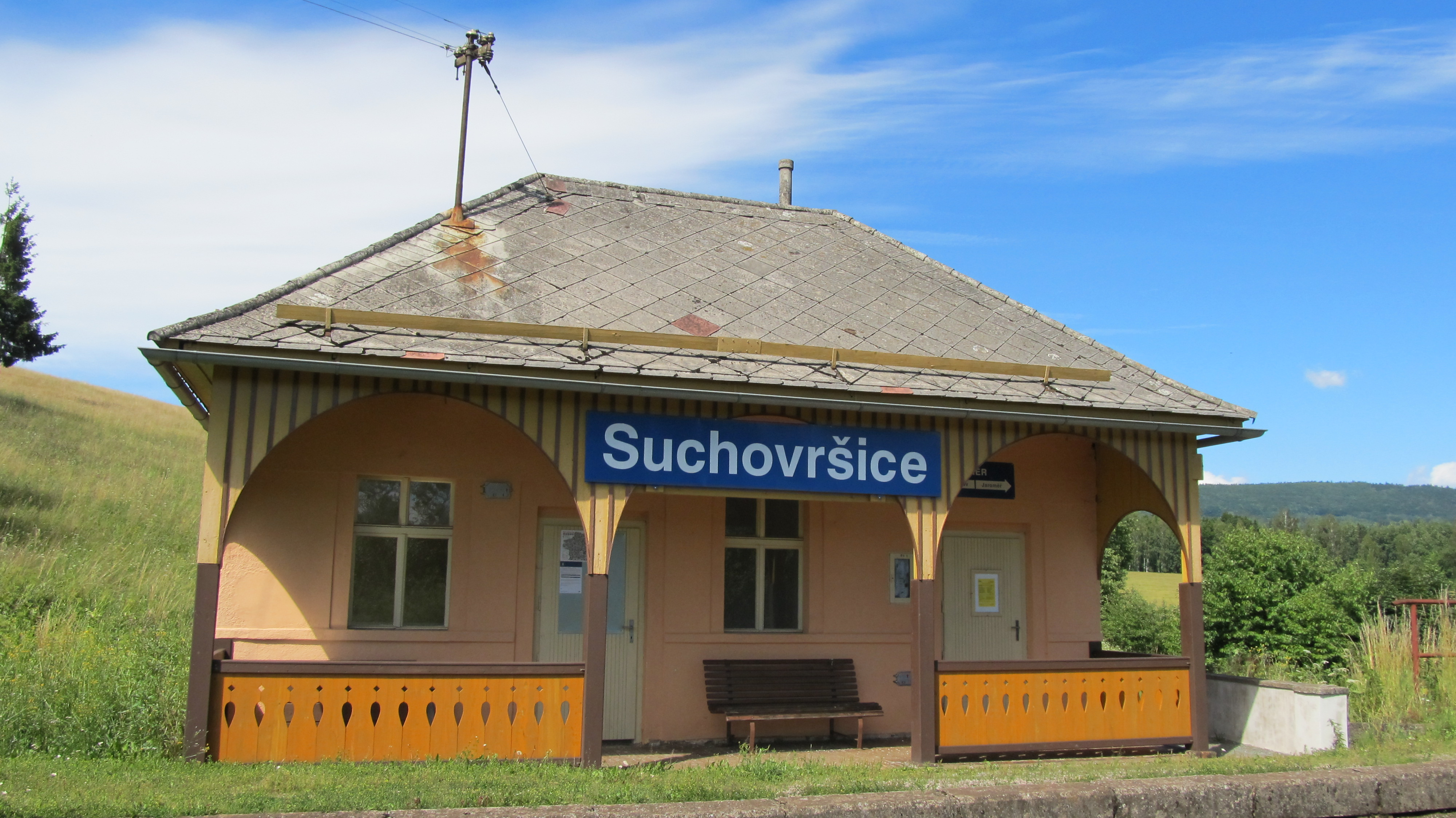
- Train station

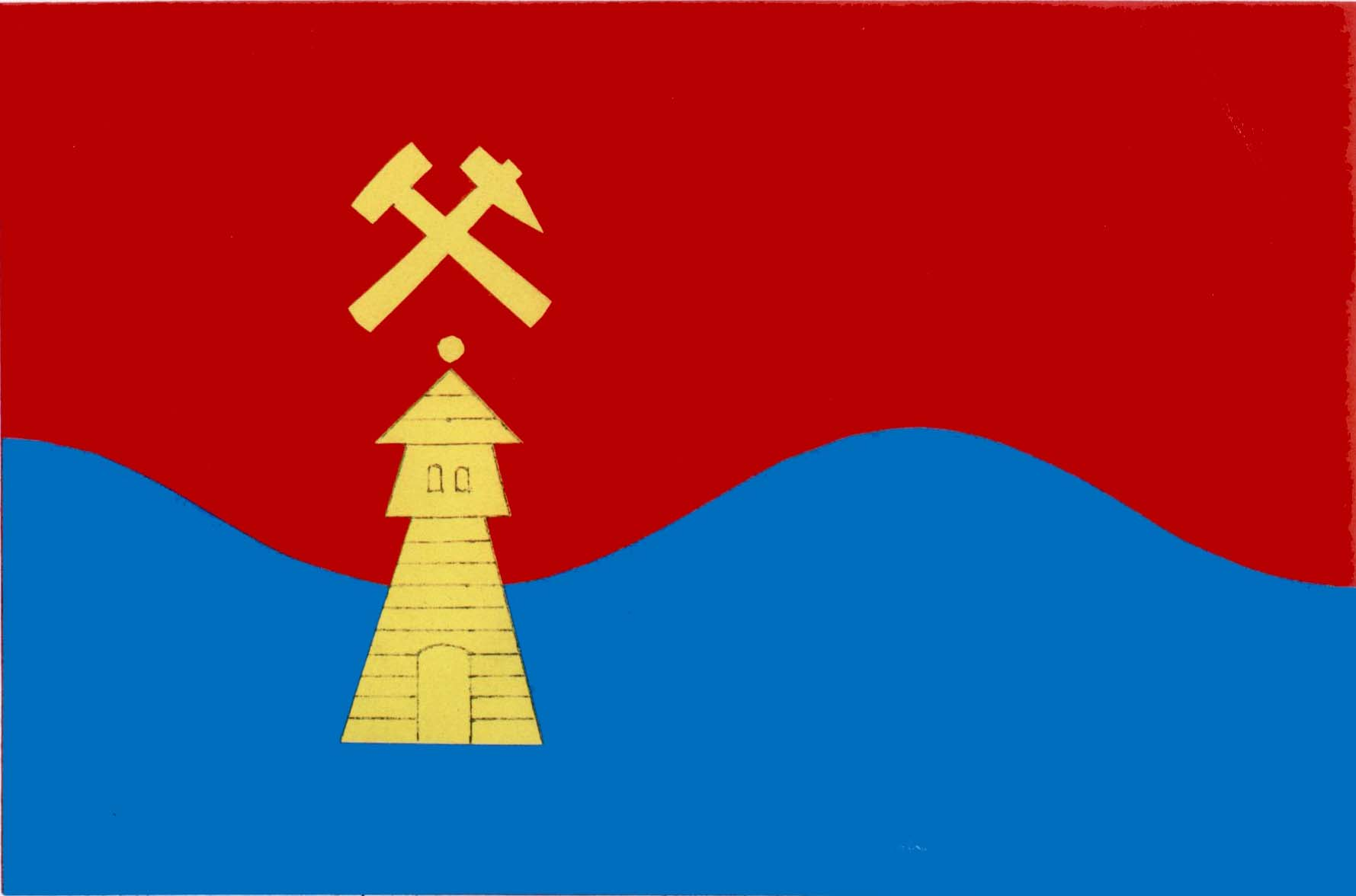
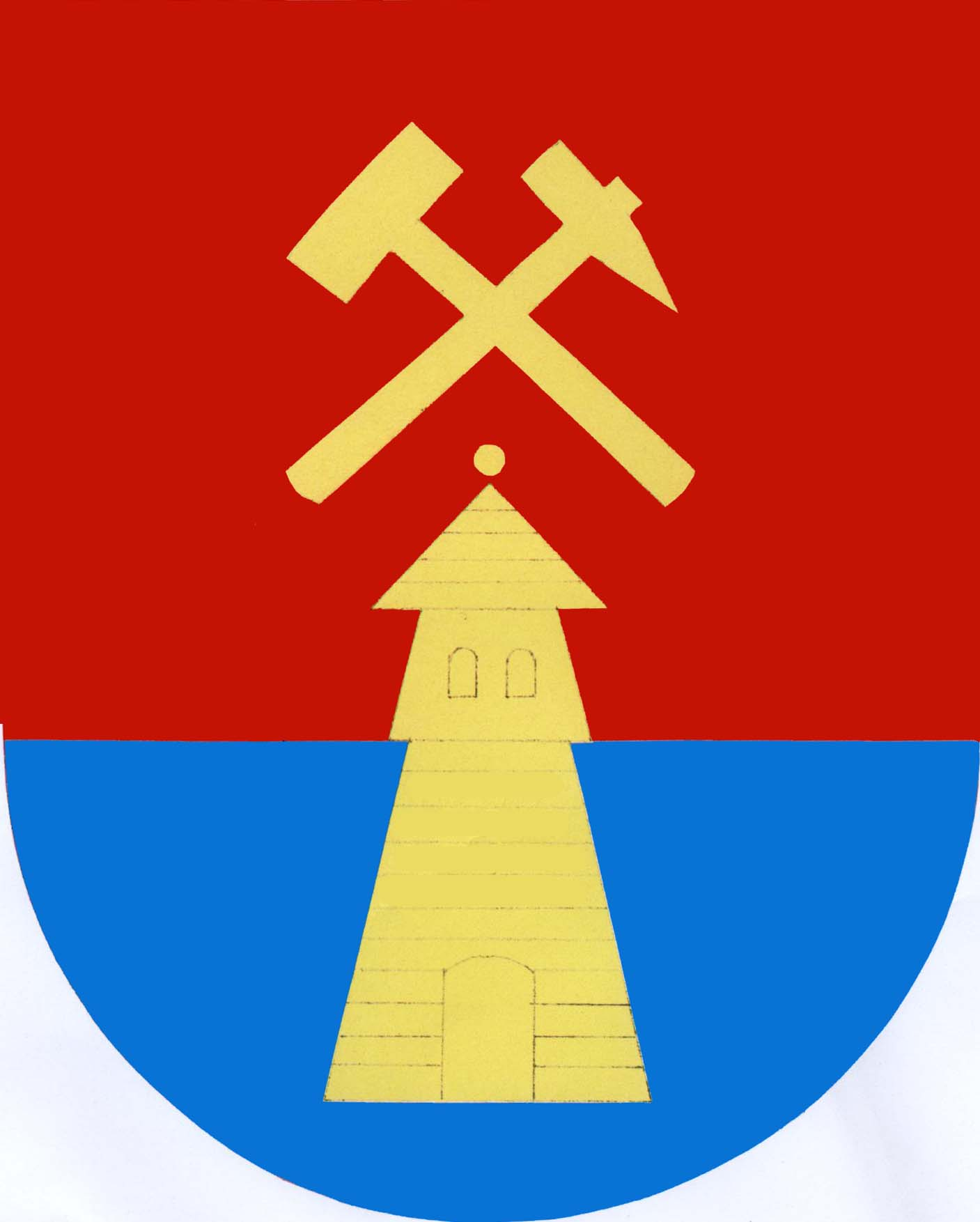
- Flag Coat of arms

- Location in the Czech Republic
- Coordinates: 50°31′24″N 15°59′54″E
- Country: Czech Republic
- Region: Hradec Králové
- District: Trutnov
- First mentioned: 1545

Area
  - Total: 4.29 km^{2} (1.66 sq mi)
- Elevation: 348 m (1,142 ft)

Population (2026-01-01)
  - Total: 376
  - Density: 87.6/km^{2} (227/sq mi)
- Time zone: UTC+1 (CET)
  - Summer (DST): UTC+2 (CEST)
- Postal code: 542 32
- Website: www.suchovrsice.cz

Suchovršice (German: Saugwitz) is a municipality and village in Trutnov District in the Hradec Králové Region of the Czech Republic. It has about 400 inhabitants.

== Demographics ==
Historical population
| Year | Pop. | ±% |
|---|---|---|
| 1869 | 582 | — |
| 1880 | 572 | −1.7% |
| 1890 | 591 | +3.3% |
| 1900 | 662 | +12.0% |
| 1910 | 864 | +30.5% |
| 1921 | 777 | −10.1% |
| 1930 | 742 | −4.5% |
| 1950 | 522 | −29.6% |
| 1961 | 530 | +1.5% |
| 1970 | 459 | −13.4% |
| 1980 | 366 | −20.3% |
| 1991 | 353 | −3.6% |
| 2001 | 357 | +1.1% |
| 2011 | 341 | −4.5% |
| 2021 | 361 | +5.9% |
Source: Censuses
