= Lampertice =

- Municipality
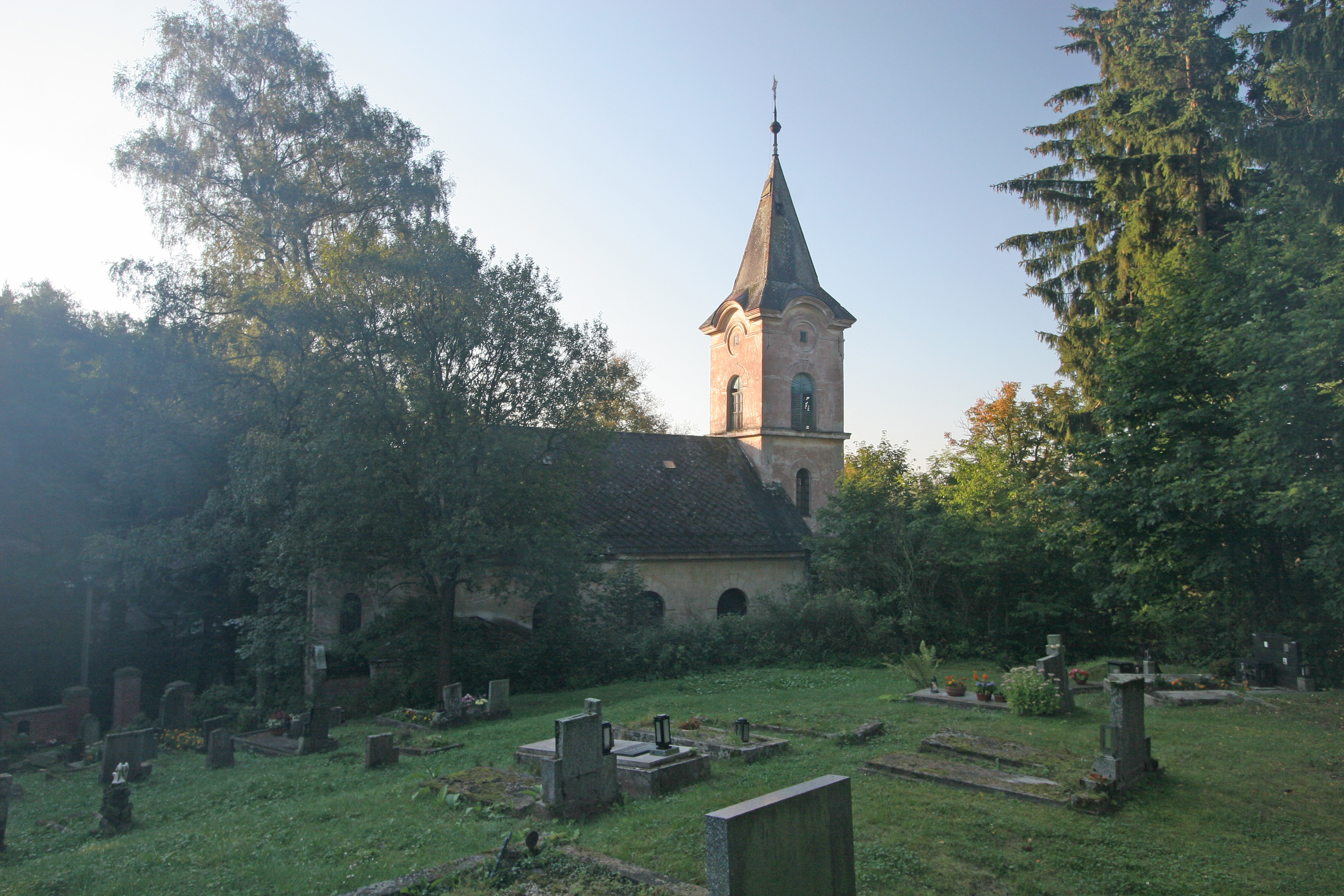
- Church of the Ascension of Christ

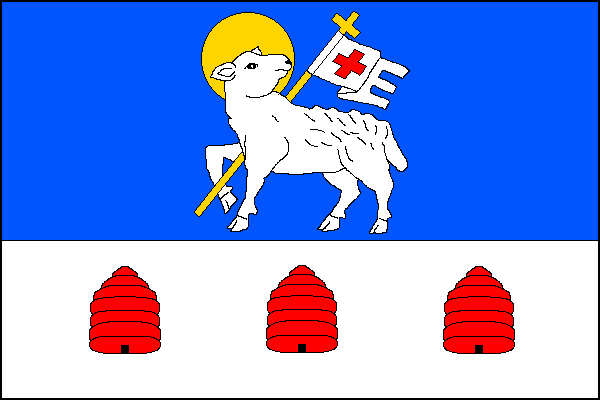
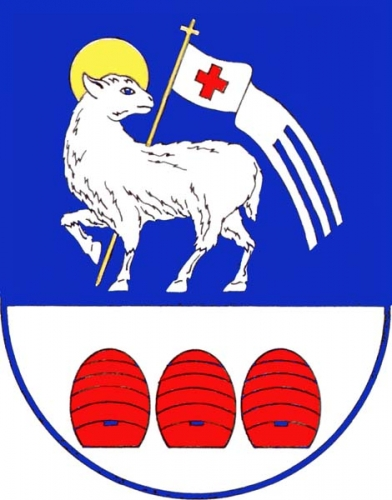
- Flag Coat of arms

- Location in the Czech Republic
- Coordinates: 50°39′53″N 15°57′4″E
- Country: Czech Republic
- Region: Hradec Králové
- District: Trutnov
- First mentioned: 1521

Area
  - Total: 5.84 km^{2} (2.25 sq mi)
- Elevation: 504 m (1,654 ft)

Population (2026-01-01)
  - Total: 350
  - Density: 60/km^{2} (160/sq mi)
- Time zone: UTC+1 (CET)
  - Summer (DST): UTC+2 (CEST)
- Postal code: 541 01
- Website: www.obeclampertice.cz

Lampertice (German: Lampersdorf) is a municipality and village in Trutnov District in the Hradec Králové Region of the Czech Republic. It has about 400 inhabitants.

== Demographics ==
Historical population
Year	Pop.	±%
1869	1,494	—
1880	1,684	+12.7%
1890	1,771	+5.2%
1900	2,050	+15.8%
1910	1,808	−11.8%
1921	1,650	−8.7%
1930	1,553	−5.9%
1950	997	−35.8%
1961	848	−14.9%
1970	713	−15.9%
1980	529	−25.8%
1991	443	−16.3%
2001	476	+7.4%
2011	413	−13.2%
2021	362	−12.3%
Source: Censuses
