= Klášterská Lhota =

- Municipality
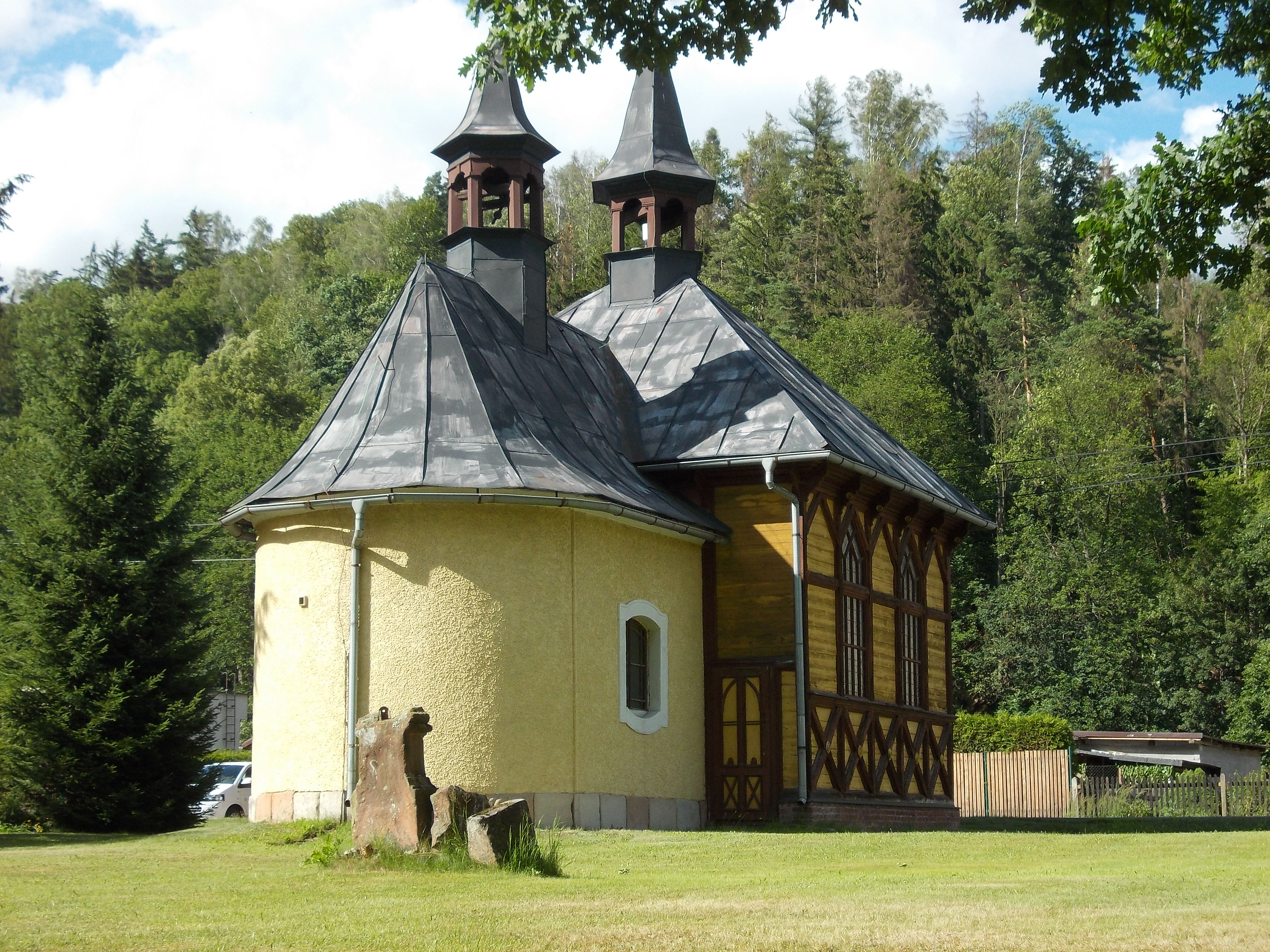
- Chapel of the Holy Trinity

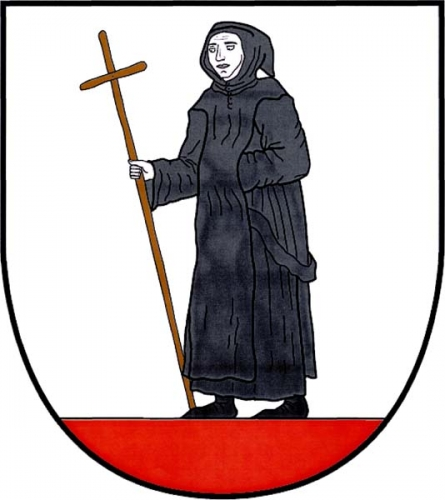
- Flag Coat of arms

- Location in the Czech Republic
- Coordinates: 50°33′35″N 15°39′49″E
- Country: Czech Republic
- Region: Hradec Králové
- District: Trutnov
- First mentioned: 1270

Area
  - Total: 3.00 km^{2} (1.16 sq mi)
- Elevation: 373 m (1,224 ft)

Population (2026-01-01)
  - Total: 232
  - Density: 77.3/km^{2} (200/sq mi)
- Time zone: UTC+1 (CET)
  - Summer (DST): UTC+2 (CEST)
- Postal code: 543 71
- Website: www.klasterskalhota.cz

Klášterská Lhota is a municipality and village in Trutnov District in the Hradec Králové Region of the Czech Republic. It has about 200 inhabitants.

== Demographics ==
Historical population
Year	Pop.	±%
1869	520	—
1880	516	−0.8%
1890	475	−7.9%
1900	457	−3.8%
1910	462	+1.1%
1921	403	−12.8%
1930	386	−4.2%
1950	288	−25.4%
1961	318	+10.4%
1970	293	−7.9%
1980	222	−24.2%
1991	184	−17.1%
2001	183	−0.5%
2011	199	+8.7%
2021	220	+10.6%
Source: Censuses

== Sights ==
The most notable monument is the Chapel of the Holy Trinity. This Empire chapel was built in 1825 and the timber-framed part was added in 1903.
