= Třebihošť =

- Municipality
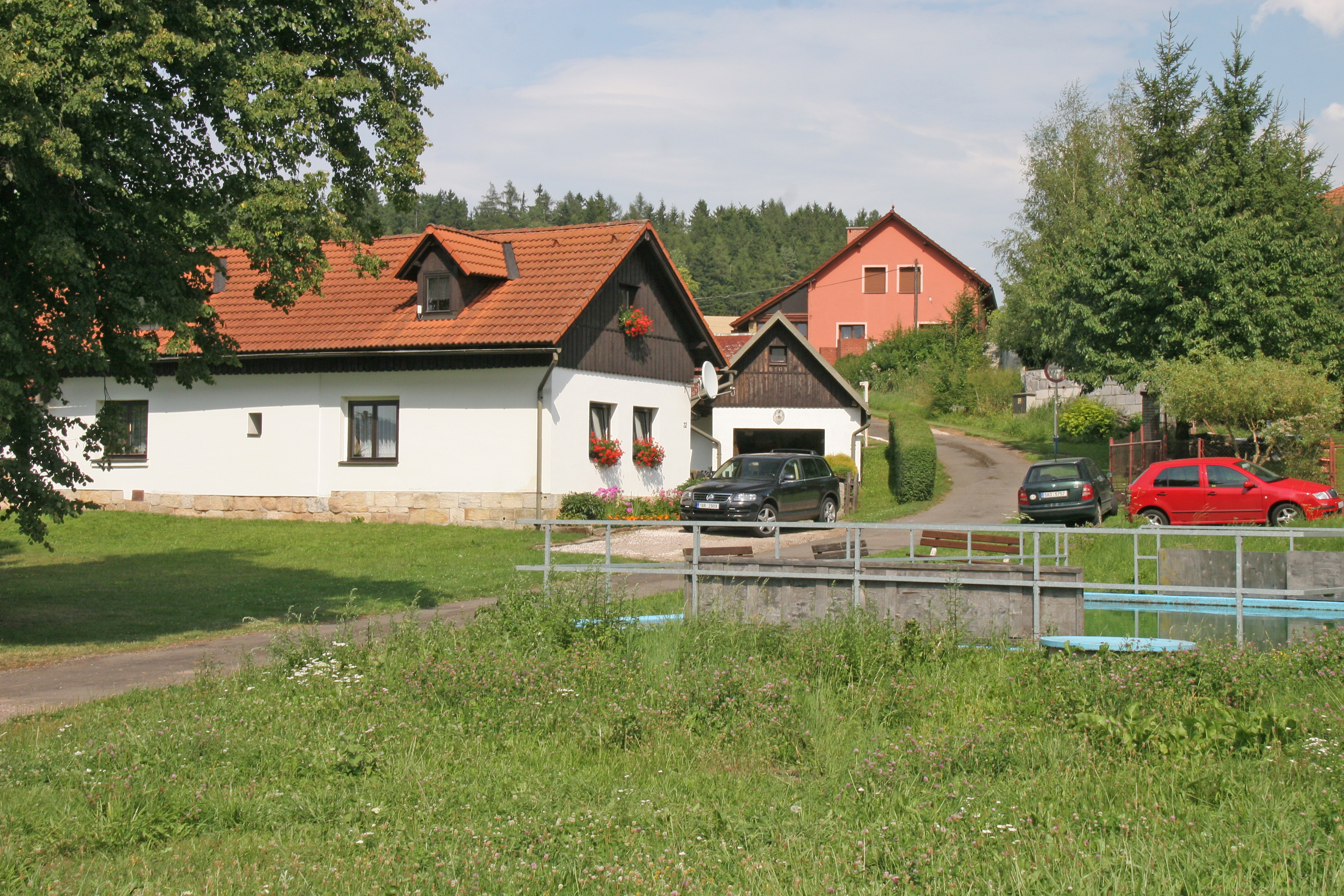
- Horní Dehtov, a part of Třebihošť

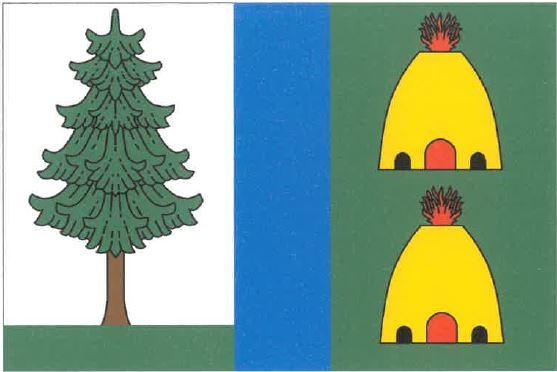
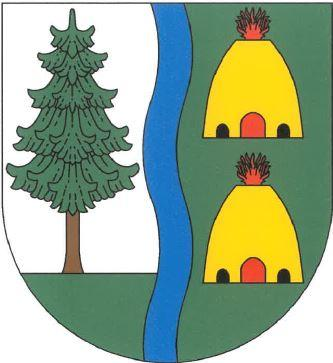
- Flag Coat of arms

- Location in the Czech Republic
- Coordinates: 50°26′0″N 15°42′35″E
- Country: Czech Republic
- Region: Hradec Králové
- District: Trutnov
- First mentioned: 1238

Area
  - Total: 13.68 km^{2} (5.28 sq mi)
- Elevation: 448 m (1,470 ft)

Population (2026-01-01)
  - Total: 463
  - Density: 33.8/km^{2} (87.7/sq mi)
- Time zone: UTC+1 (CET)
  - Summer (DST): UTC+2 (CEST)
- Postal code: 544 01
- Website: www.trebihost.cz

Třebihošť is a municipality and village in Trutnov District in the Hradec Králové Region of the Czech Republic. It has about 500 inhabitants.

== Administrative division ==
Třebihošť consists of three municipal parts (in brackets population according to the 2021 census):

- Třebihošť (311)
- Dolní Dehtov (36)
- Horní Dehtov (95)

== Demographics ==
Historical population
Year	Pop.	±%
1869	1,613	—
1880	1,539	−4.6%
1890	1,503	−2.3%
1900	1,427	−5.1%
1910	1,349	−5.5%
1921	1,214	−10.0%
1930	1,159	−4.5%
1950	625	−46.1%
1961	573	−8.3%
1970	509	−11.2%
1980	394	−22.6%
1991	365	−7.4%
2001	369	+1.1%
2011	416	+12.7%
2021	442	+6.2%
Source: Censuses
