= Zdobín =

- Municipality
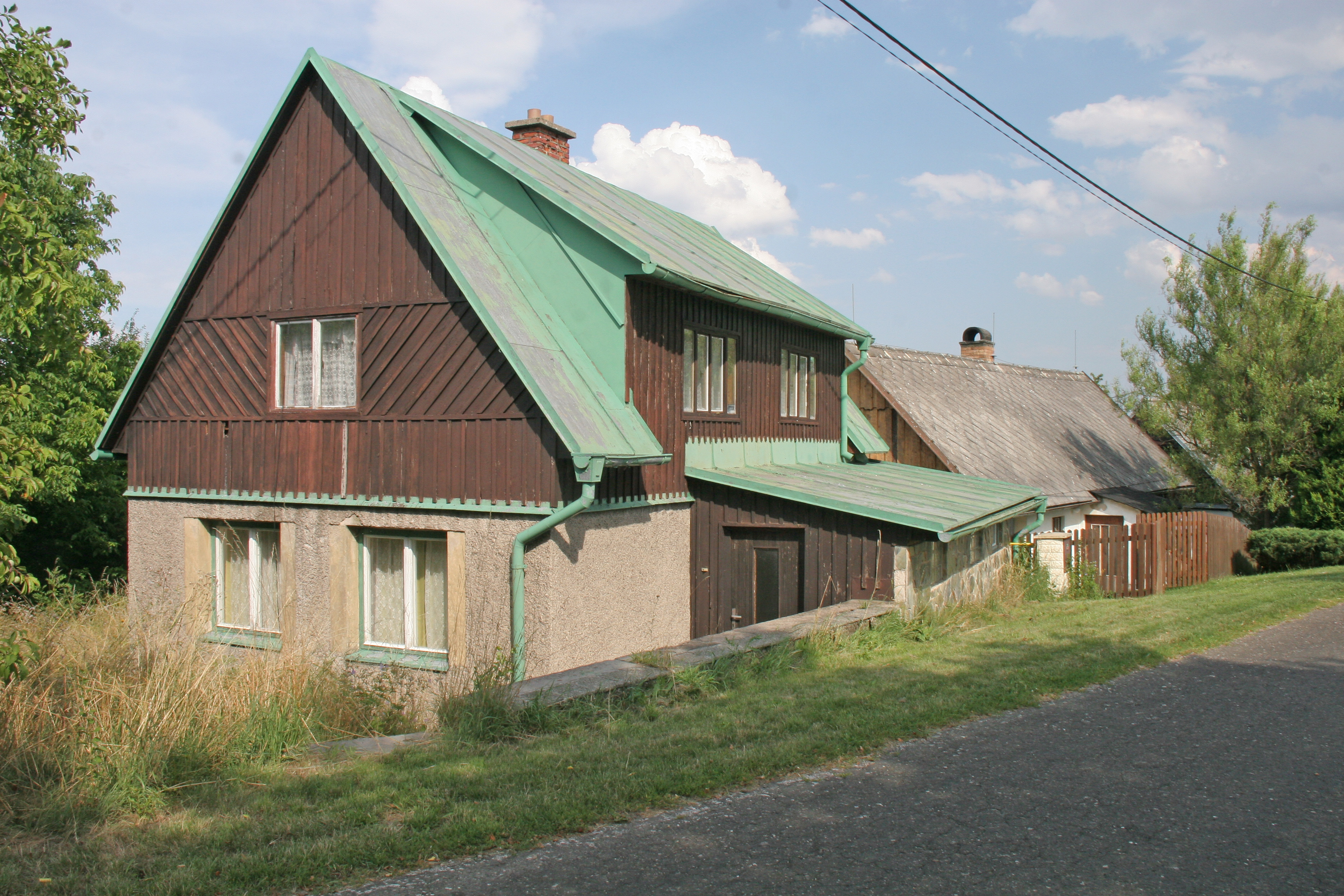
- House No. 22

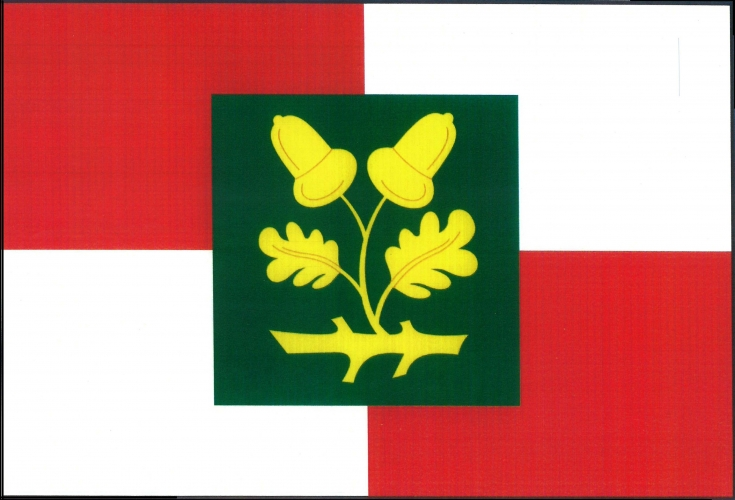
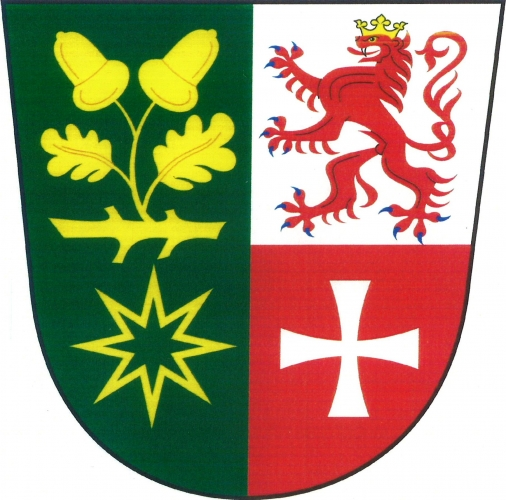
- Flag Coat of arms

- Location in the Czech Republic
- Coordinates: 50°24′55″N 15°42′18″E
- Country: Czech Republic
- Region: Hradec Králové
- District: Trutnov
- First mentioned: 1267

Area
  - Total: 2.10 km^{2} (0.81 sq mi)
- Elevation: 418 m (1,371 ft)

Population (2026-01-01)
  - Total: 149
  - Density: 71.0/km^{2} (184/sq mi)
- Time zone: UTC+1 (CET)
  - Summer (DST): UTC+2 (CEST)
- Postal code: 544 01
- Website: www.zdobin.cz

Zdobín is a municipality and village in Trutnov District in the Hradec Králové Region of the Czech Republic. It has about 100 inhabitants.

== Demographics ==
Historical population
Year	Pop.	±%
1869	312	—
1880	350	+12.2%
1890	302	−13.7%
1900	302	+0.0%
1910	268	−11.3%
1921	261	−2.6%
1930	222	−14.9%
1950	169	−23.9%
1961	173	+2.4%
1970	151	−12.7%
1980	135	−10.6%
1991	111	−17.8%
2001	97	−12.6%
2011	103	+6.2%
2021	134	+30.1%
Source: Censuses
