= Vilantice =

- Municipality
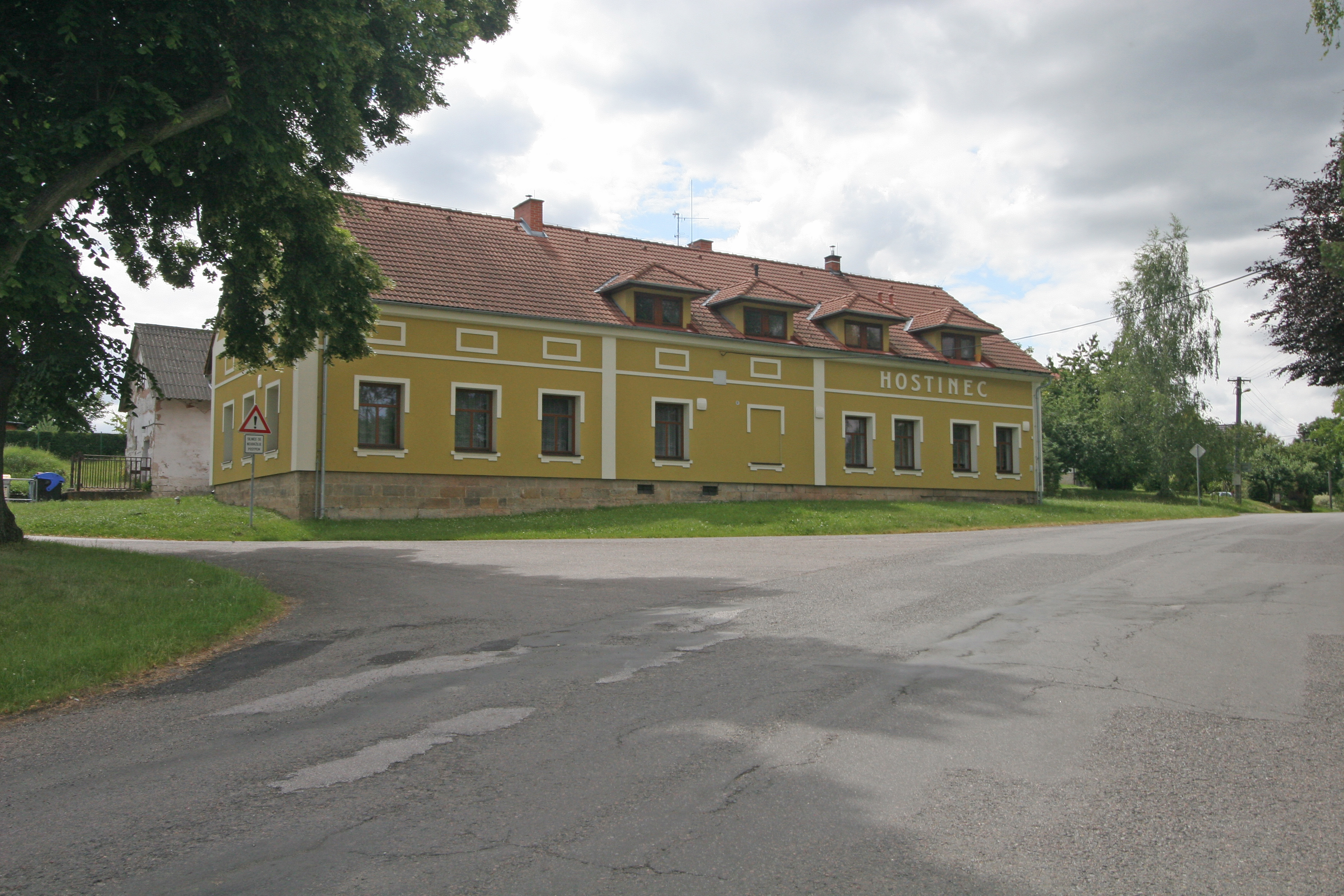
- A pub in Vilantice

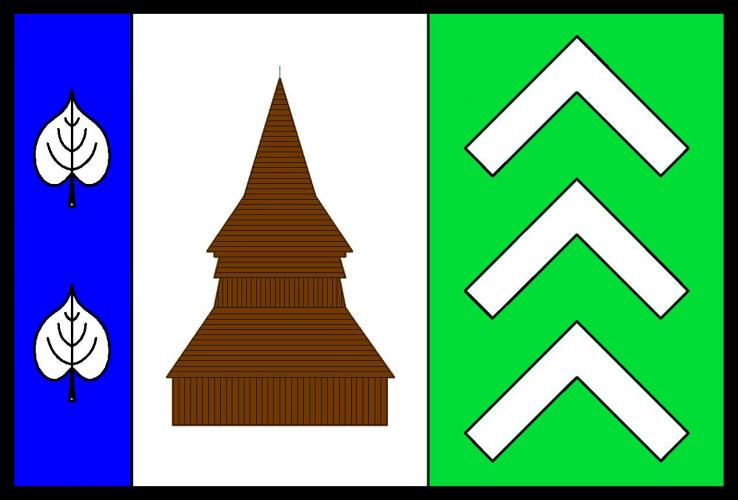
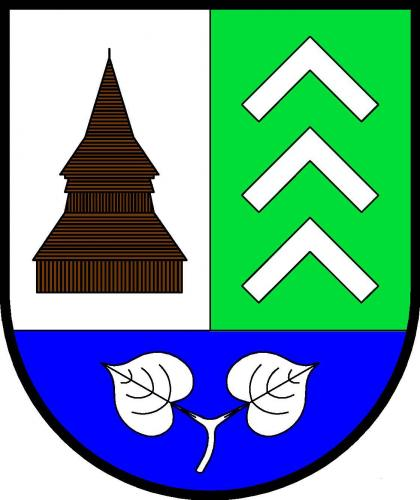
- Flag Coat of arms

- Location in the Czech Republic
- Coordinates: 50°21′57″N 15°47′20″E
- Country: Czech Republic
- Region: Hradec Králové
- District: Trutnov
- First mentioned: 1490

Area
  - Total: 4.92 km^{2} (1.90 sq mi)
- Elevation: 304 m (997 ft)

Population (2026-01-01)
  - Total: 203
  - Density: 41.3/km^{2} (107/sq mi)
- Time zone: UTC+1 (CET)
  - Summer (DST): UTC+2 (CEST)
- Postal code: 544 01
- Website: vilantice.cz

Vilantice is a municipality and village in Trutnov District in the Hradec Králové Region of the Czech Republic. It has about 200 inhabitants.

== Administrative division ==
Vilantice consists of two municipal parts (in brackets population according to the 2021 census):

- Vilantice (163)
- Chotěborky (21)

== Demographics ==
Historical population
Year	Pop.	±%
1869	691	—
1880	687	−0.6%
1890	636	−7.4%
1900	530	−16.7%
1910	562	+6.0%
1921	487	−13.3%
1930	429	−11.9%
1950	280	−34.7%
1961	272	−2.9%
1970	256	−5.9%
1980	243	−5.1%
1991	199	−18.1%
2001	187	−6.0%
2011	194	+3.7%
2021	184	−5.2%
Source: Censuses

== Notable people ==
- František Xaver Dušek, (1731–1799), composer and musician
