= Trutnov District =

Trutnov District Okres Trutnov
- District
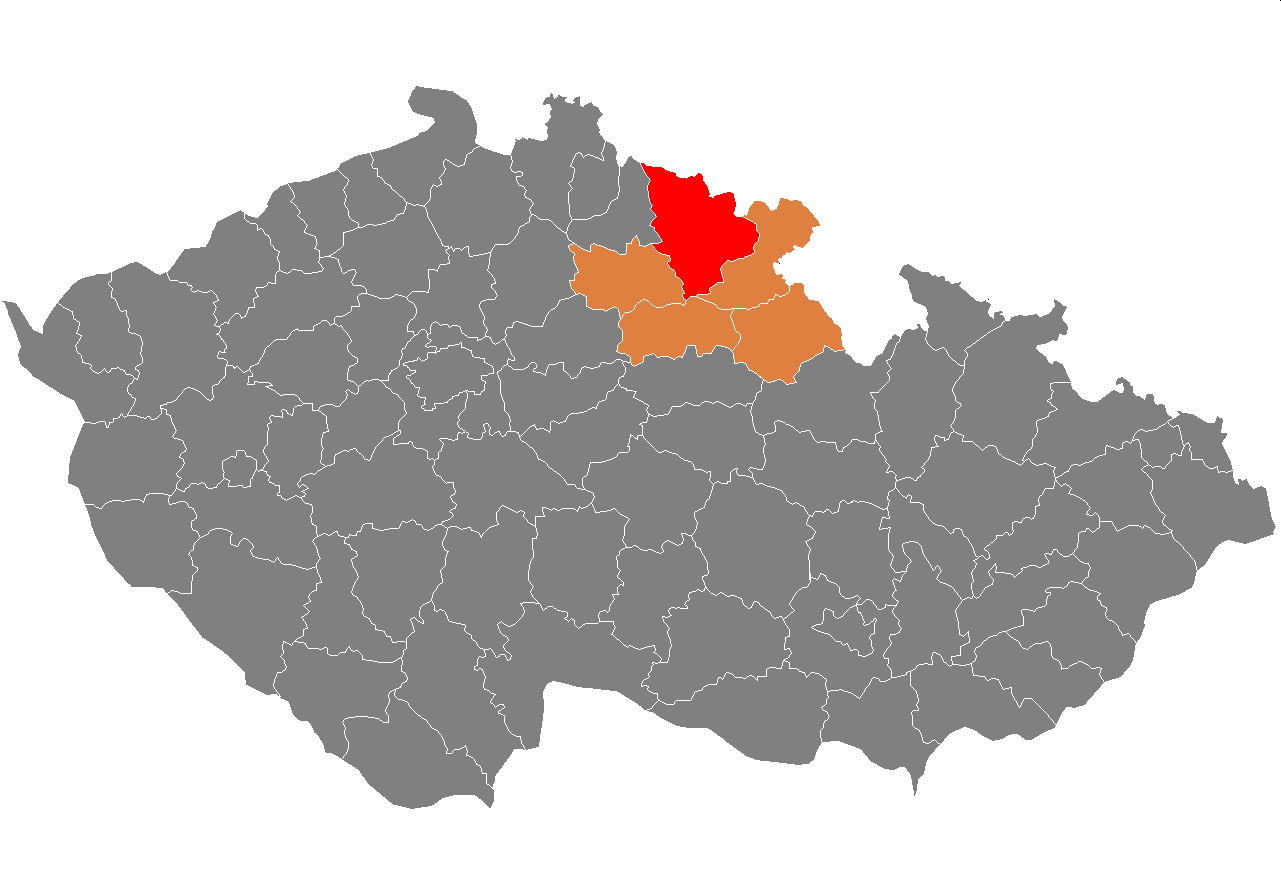
- Location in the Hradec Králové Region within the Czech Republic
- Coordinates: 50°34′N 15°49′E
- Country: Czech Republic
- Region: Hradec Králové
- Capital: Trutnov

Area
  - Total: 1,146.74 km^{2} (442.76 sq mi)

Population (2026)
  - Total: 116,008
  - Density: 101.163/km^{2} (262.012/sq mi)
- Time zone: UTC+1 (CET)
  - Summer (DST): UTC+2 (CEST)
- Municipalities: 75
- * Towns: 12
- * Market towns: 4

Trutnov District (Czech: okres Trutnov) is a district in the Hradec Králové Region of the Czech Republic. Its capital is the town of Trutnov.

== Administrative division ==
Trutnov District is divided into three administrative districts of municipalities with extended competence: Trutnov, Dvůr Králové nad Labem and Vrchlabí.

=== List of municipalities ===
Towns are marked in bold and market towns in italics:

Batňovice - Bernartice - Bílá Třemešná - Bílé Poličany - Borovnice - Borovnička - Čermná - Černý Důl - Chotěvice - Choustníkovo Hradiště - Chvaleč - Dolní Branná - Dolní Brusnice - Dolní Dvůr - Dolní Kalná - Dolní Lánov - Dolní Olešnice - Doubravice - Dubenec - Dvůr Králové nad Labem - Hajnice - Havlovice - Horní Brusnice - Horní Kalná - Horní Maršov - Horní Olešnice - Hostinné - Hřibojedy - Janské Lázně - Jívka - Klášterská Lhota - Kocbeře - Kohoutov - Královec - Kuks - Kunčice nad Labem - Lampertice - Lánov - Lanžov - Libňatov - Libotov - Litíč - Malá Úpa - Malé Svatoňovice - Maršov u Úpice - Mladé Buky - Mostek - Nemojov - Pec pod Sněžkou - Pilníkov - Prosečné - Radvanice - Rtyně v Podkrkonoší - Rudník - Špindlerův Mlýn - Stanovice - Staré Buky - Strážné - Suchovršice - Svoboda nad Úpou - Třebihošť - Trotina - Trutnov - Úpice - Velké Svatoňovice - Velký Vřešťov - Vilantice - Vítězná - Vlčice - Vlčkovice v Podkrkonoší - Vrchlabí - Zábřezí-Řečice - Žacléř - Zdobín - Zlatá Olešnice

== Geography ==
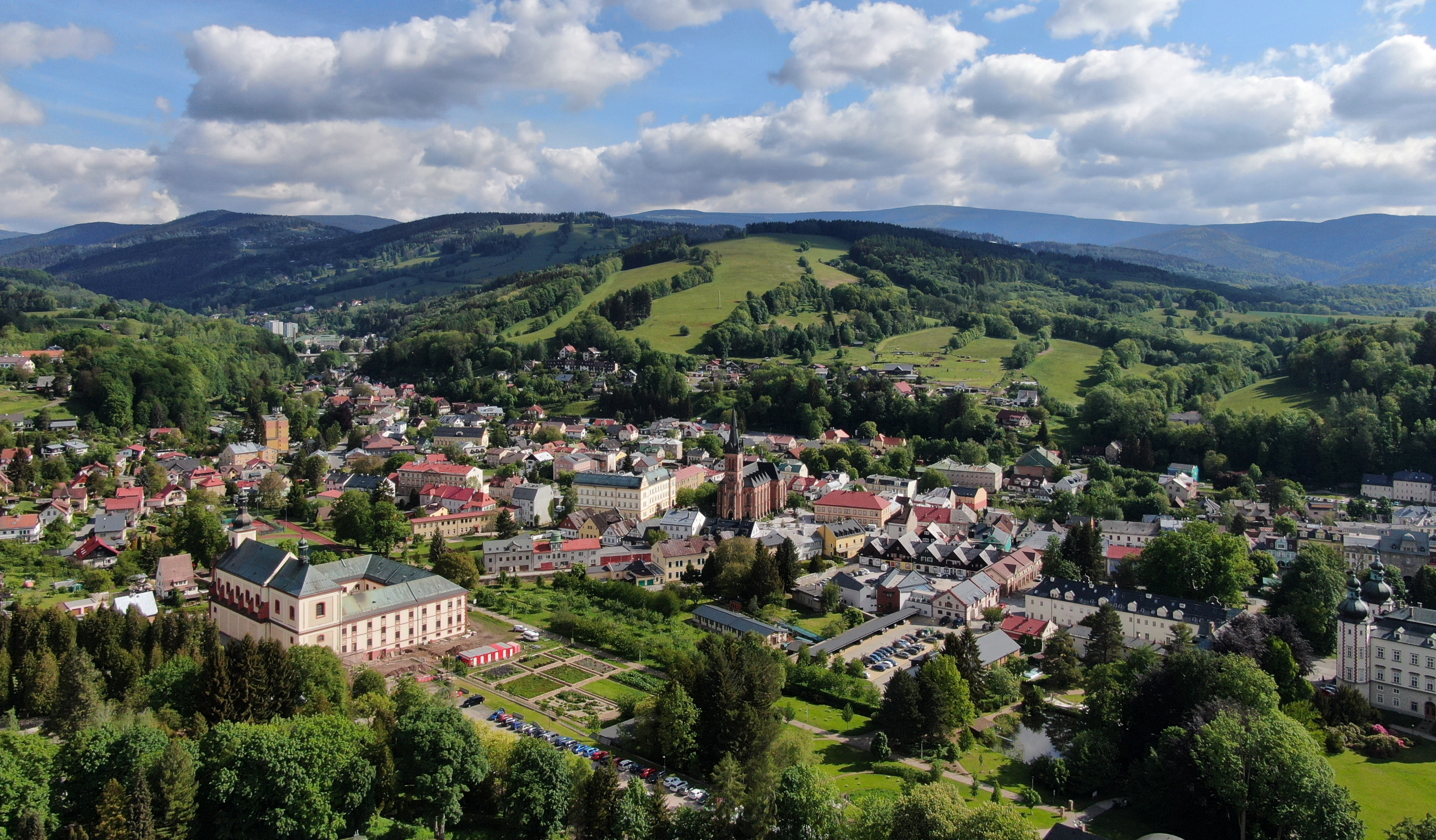
Vrchlabí and surrounding landscape

Trutnov District borders Poland in the north. The territory of the district has a highly fragmented terrain with large differences in height. The mountain massif in the north gradually turns into uplands that continues to the south of the district. The territory extends into five geomorphological mesoregions: Giant Mountains (north), Giant Mountains Foothills (centre), Broumov Highlands (northeast), Jičín Uplands (south) and East Elbe Table (small part in the south). The highest point of the district and of the entire country is the mountain Sněžka in Pec pod Sněžkou with an elevation of 1,603 m (5,259 ft), the lowest point is the river bed of the Elbe in Kuks at 264 m (866 ft).

From the total district area of 1,146.7 km^{2} (442.7 sq mi), agricultural land occupies 495.4 km^{2} (191.3 sq mi), forests occupy 539.4 km^{2} (208.3 sq mi), and water area occupies 12.0 km^{2} (4.6 sq mi). Forests cover 47.0% of the district's area.

The most important river is the Elbe, which originates here and crosses the territory from northwest to south. The Úpa also originates here, flows through the eastern part of the district and flows into the Elbe outside the district. Other notable rivers that originate here, but soon after leave the territory, are the Bóbr and Bystřice. The area is poor in bodies of water. The largest body of water is the Les Království Reservoir.

Most of the Giant Mountains area of the district is protected as the Krkonoše National Park and belongs to the most valuable area of the country thanks to a significant amount of rare flora and fauna. In the east, the Broumovsko Protected Landscape Area extends into the district.

== Demographics ==
Historical population

Year	Pop.	±%
1869	146,218	—
1880	153,935	+5.3%
1890	159,164	+3.4%
1900	166,056	+4.3%
1910	174,998	+5.4%

Year	Pop.	±%
1921	157,023	−10.3%
1930	165,171	+5.2%
1950	127,666	−22.7%
1961	124,014	−2.9%
1970	121,459	−2.1%

Year	Pop.	±%
1980	124,237	+2.3%
1991	121,414	−2.3%
2001	120,777	−0.5%
2011	118,174	−2.2%
2021	113,530	−3.9%

Source: Censuses

=== Most populous municipalities ===
Name	Population	Area (km^{2})
Trutnov	29,337	103
Dvůr Králové nad Labem	15,316	36
Vrchlabí	12,028	28
Úpice	5,379	15
Hostinné	4,082	8
Žacléř	3,097	22
Rtyně v Podkrkonoší	2,841	14
Mladé Buky	2,301	27
Rudník	1,993	43
Svoboda nad Úpou	1,923	8

== Economy ==
The largest employers with headquarters in Trutnov District and at least 500 employees are:

Economic entity	Location	Number of employees	Main activity
Vitesco Technologies Czech Republic	Trutnov	4,000–4,999	Manufacture of electrical equipment
Juta	Dvůr Králové nad Labem	2,000–2,499	Manufacture of technical and industrial textiles
Regional Hospital Trutnov	Trutnov	1,000–1,499	Health care
TE Connectivity Trutnov	Trutnov	1,000–1,499	Manufacture of electronic components
Státní léčebné lázně Janské Lázně	Janské Lázně	500–999	Health care
ARGO-HYTOS	Vrchlabí	500–999	Manufacture of components for the hydraulic industry

== Transport ==
There are no motorways passing through the district. The most important roads are the I/14 from Náchod to Liberec, the I/16 from Jičín to the Czech–Polish border, and the I/37, which connects Trutnov with the D11 motorway.

== Sights ==
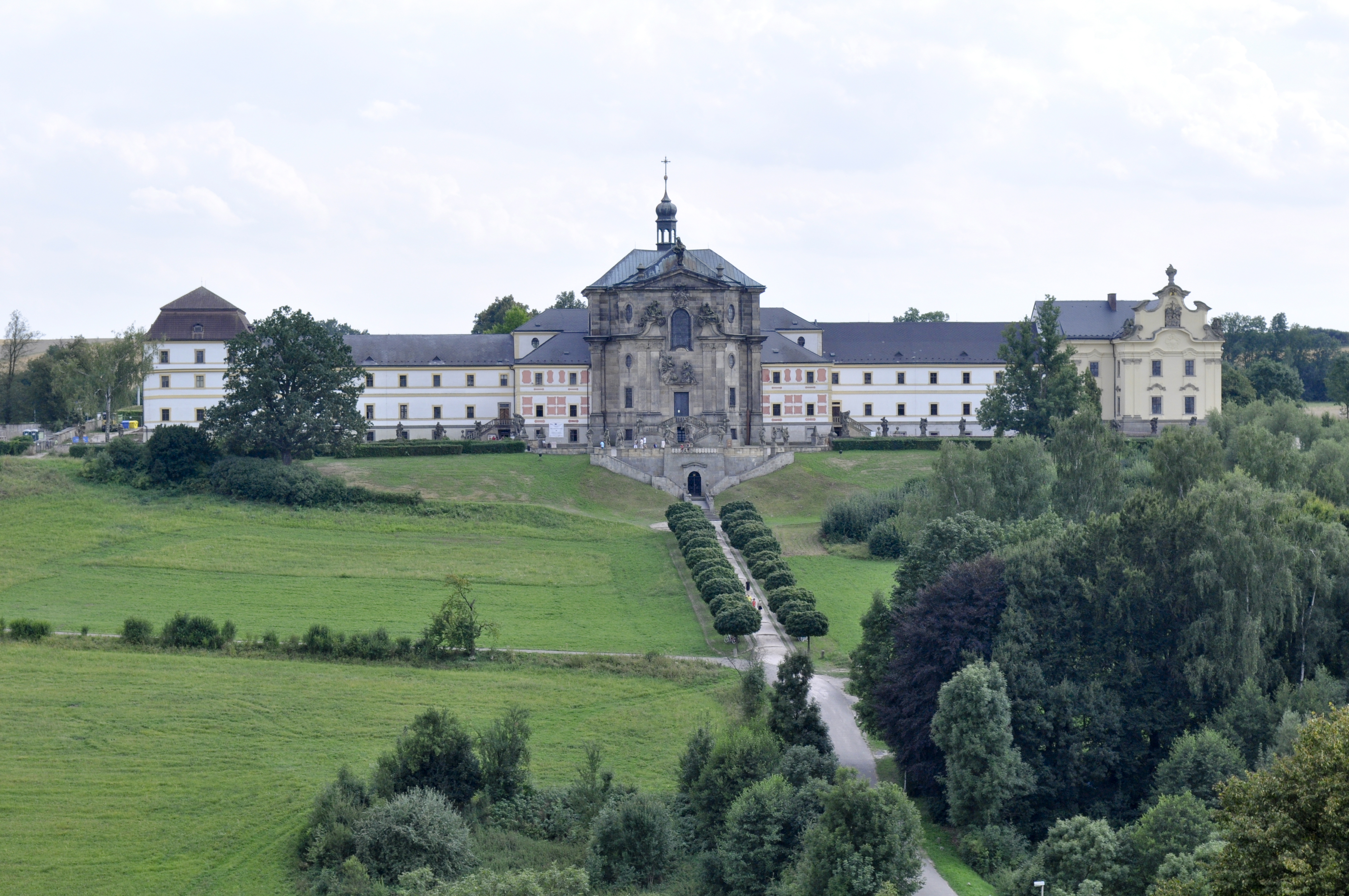
Kuks Hospital

The most important monuments in the district, protected as national cultural monuments, are:

- Kuks Hospital
- Braun's Nativity Scene near Kuks in Hřibojedy and Stanovice
- Dřevěnka Inn in Úpice
- Les Království Reservoir in Bílá Třemešná and Nemojov
- Hostinné Town Hall

The best-preserved settlements and landscapes, protected as monument reservations and monument zones, are:

- Baroque complex in Kuks (monument reservation)
- Dvůr Králové nad Labem
- Hostinné
- Pilníkov
- Trutnov
- Vrchlabí
- Žacléř
- Chotěborky
- Jívka-Dolní Vernéřovice
- Malá Úpa-Šímovy Chalupy
- Pec pod Sněžkou-Modrý Důl
- Pec pod Sněžkou-Velké Tippeltovy Boudy
- Radvanice

Five of the ten most visited tourist destinations of the Hradec Králové Region are located in Trutnov District. The most visited tourist destinations are Safari Park Dvůr Králové, Sněžka–Pec pod Sněžkou cable car, Krkonoše Tree Top Trail in Janské Lázně, Baroque complex in Kuks, and hiking trail from Špindlerův Mlýn-Jelení Boudy to Sněžka.
