= Horní Olešnice =

- Municipality
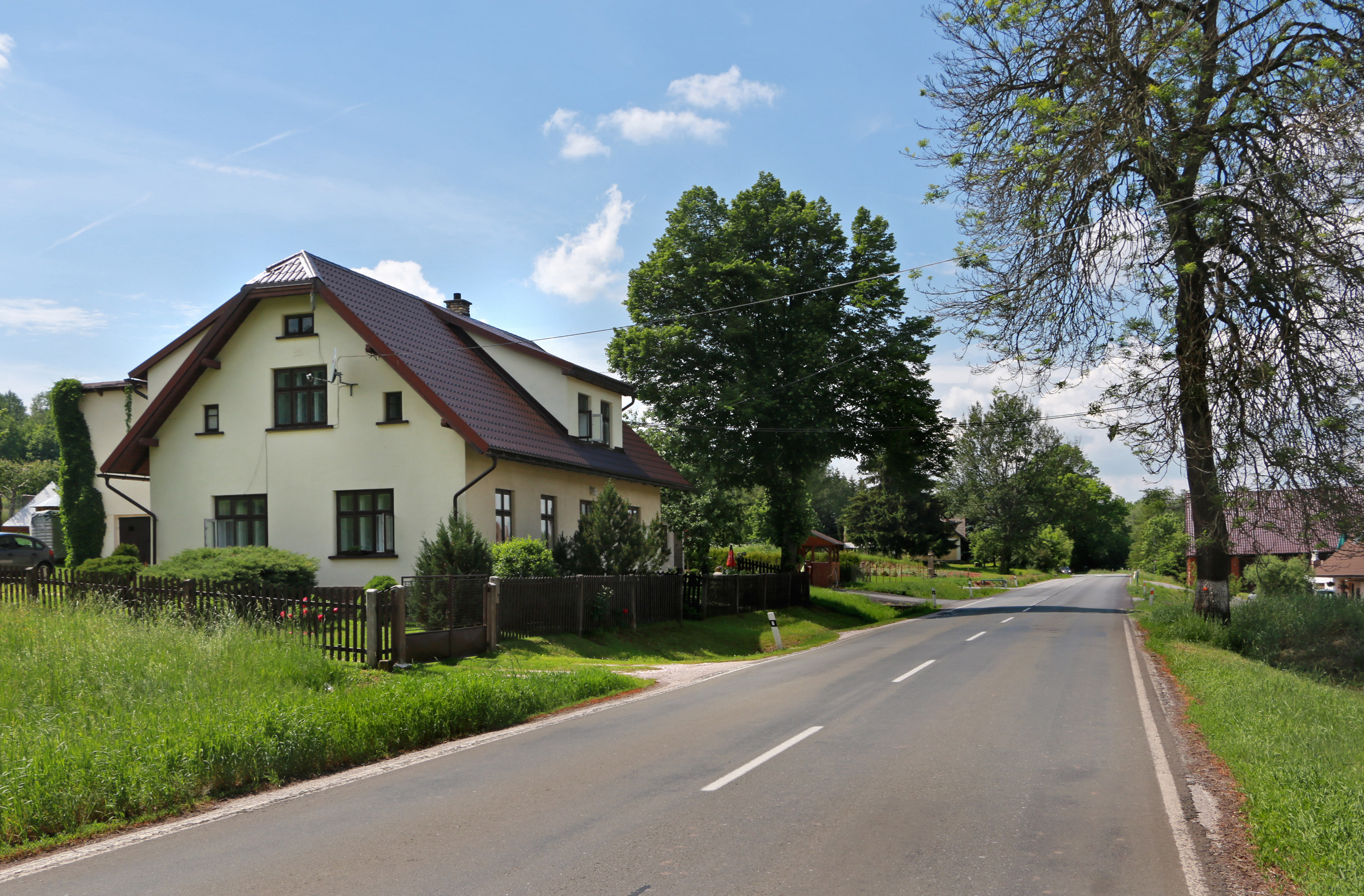
- Main road

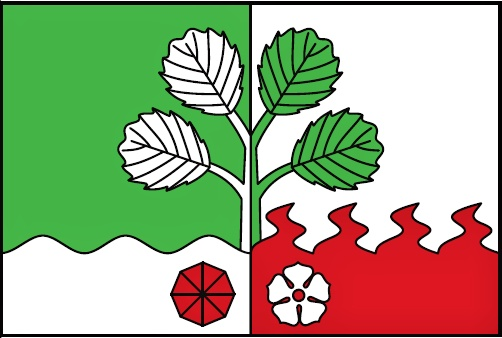
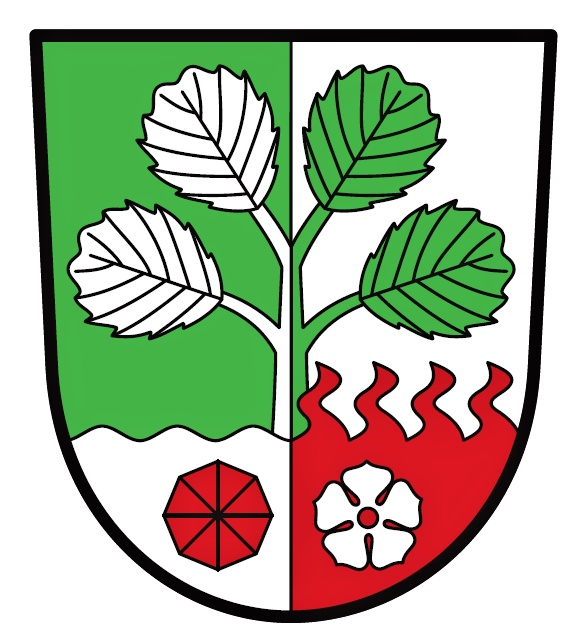
- Flag Coat of arms

- Location in the Czech Republic
- Coordinates: 50°31′58″N 15°40′39″E
- Country: Czech Republic
- Region: Hradec Králové
- District: Trutnov
- First mentioned: 1241

Area
  - Total: 12.73 km^{2} (4.92 sq mi)
- Elevation: 364 m (1,194 ft)

Population (2026-01-01)
  - Total: 304
  - Density: 23.9/km^{2} (61.9/sq mi)
- Time zone: UTC+1 (CET)
  - Summer (DST): UTC+2 (CEST)
- Postal code: 543 71
- Website: www.horniolesnice.cz

Horní Olešnice (German: Ober Oels) is a municipality and village in Trutnov District in the Hradec Králové Region of the Czech Republic. It has about 300 inhabitants.

== Administrative division ==
Horní Olešnice consists of two municipal parts (in brackets population according to the 2021 census):

- Horní Olešnice (190)
- Ždírnice (101)

== Demographics ==
Historical population
Year	Pop.	±%
1869	1,269	—
1880	1,273	+0.3%
1890	1,301	+2.2%
1900	1,197	−8.0%
1910	1,104	−7.8%
1921	982	−11.1%
1930	954	−2.9%
1950	617	−35.3%
1961	570	−7.6%
1970	496	−13.0%
1980	390	−21.4%
1991	280	−28.2%
2001	288	+2.9%
2011	264	−8.3%
2021	291	+10.2%
Source: Censuses

== Notable people ==
- Vladimír Janoušek (1922–1986), sculptor and painter
