= Radvanice (Trutnov District) =

- Municipality
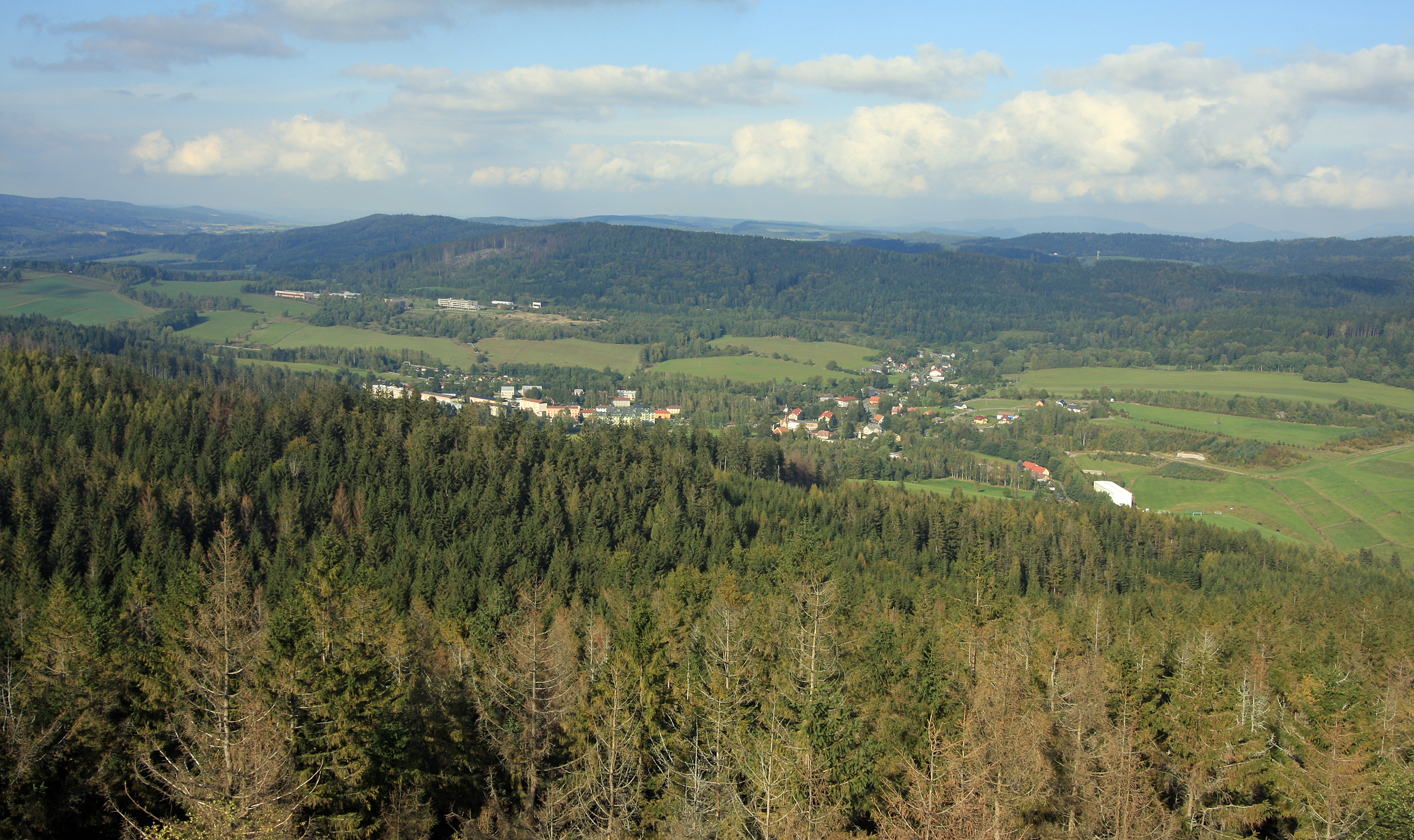
- View from the south

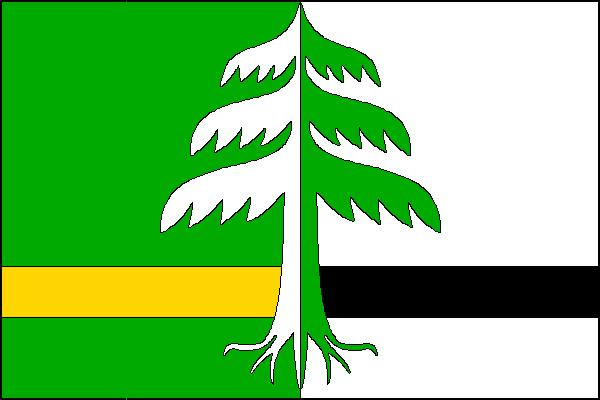
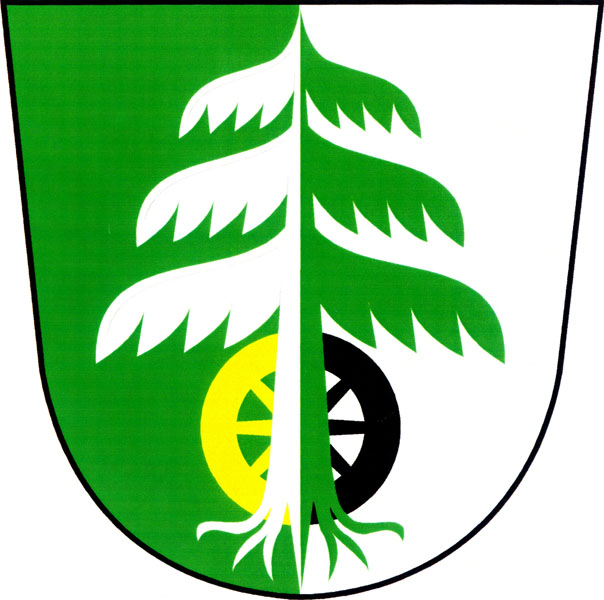
- Flag Coat of arms

- Location in the Czech Republic
- Coordinates: 50°34′3″N 16°3′43″E
- Country: Czech Republic
- Region: Hradec Králové
- District: Trutnov
- First mentioned: 1607

Area
  - Total: 10.76 km^{2} (4.15 sq mi)
- Elevation: 521 m (1,709 ft)

Population (2026-01-01)
  - Total: 922
  - Density: 85.7/km^{2} (222/sq mi)
- Time zone: UTC+1 (CET)
  - Summer (DST): UTC+2 (CEST)
- Postal code: 542 12
- Website: www.radvanice.cz

Radvanice is a municipality and village in Trutnov District in the Hradec Králové Region of the Czech Republic. It has about 900 inhabitants.

== Demographics ==
Historical population
Year	Pop.	±%
1869	1,790	—
1880	1,600	−10.6%
1890	1,443	−9.8%
1900	1,360	−5.8%
1910	1,283	−5.7%
1921	1,205	−6.1%
1930	1,086	−9.9%
1950	754	−30.6%
1961	865	+14.7%
1970	1,098	+26.9%
1980	994	−9.5%
1991	1,027	+3.3%
2001	1,092	+6.3%
2011	1,008	−7.7%
2021	916	−9.1%
Source: Censuses
