= List of army units called "guards" =

This is a list of past and present army units whose names include the word called Guards: border guards, coast guards, civil guards, home guards, national guards, honour guards, republican guards, foot guards, imperial guards and royal guards are listed under their own articles.

== Active ==
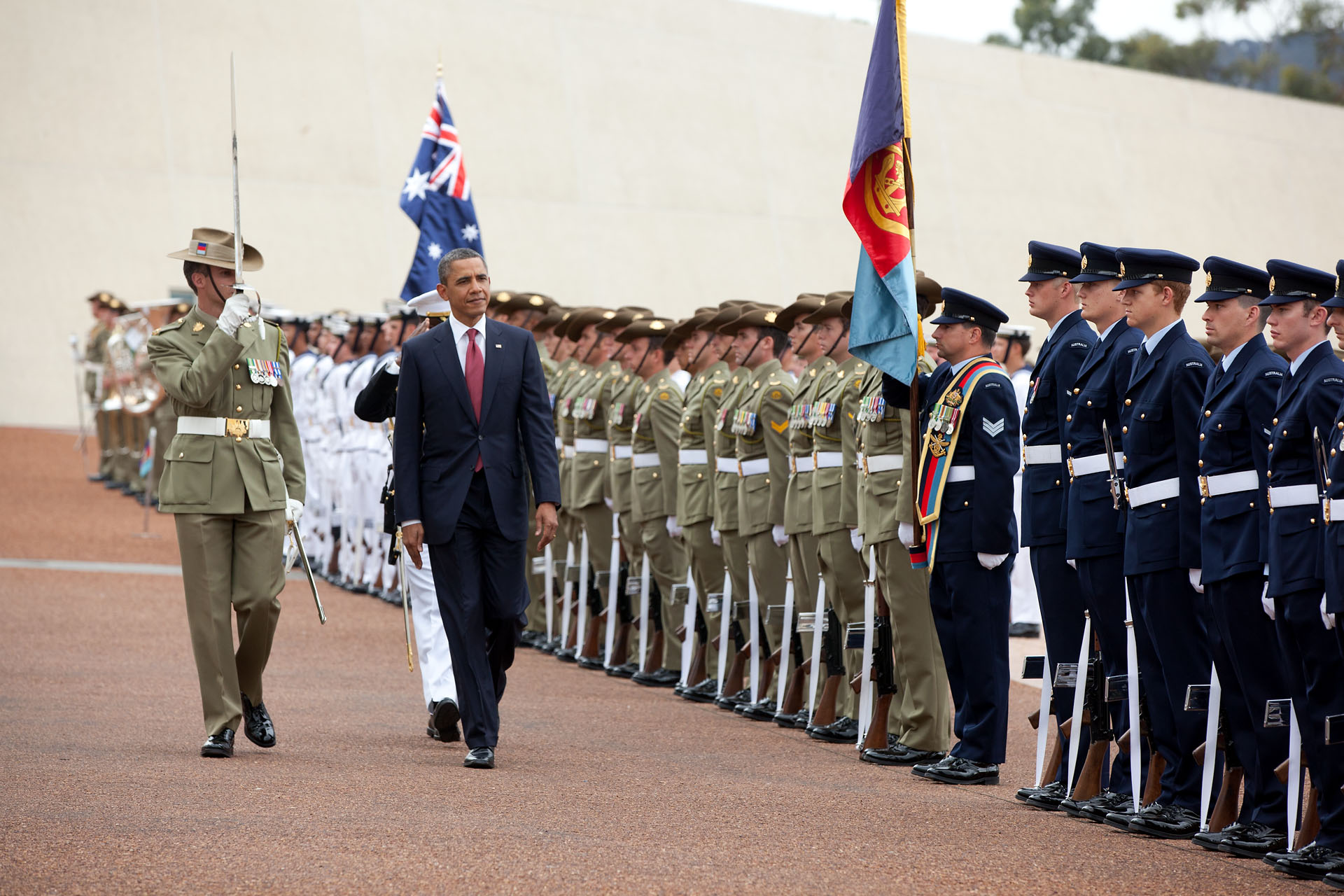
Australia's Federation Guard

=== Australia ===
- Federation Guard
- Airfield Defence Guards

=== Austria ===
- Gardebataillon

=== Bahrain ===
- Royal Guard

=== Belarus ===
- 38th Guards Air Assault Brigade
- 51st Guards Artillery Brigade
- 72nd Guards Joint Training Centre
- 120th Guards Mechanised Brigade
- 11th Guards Berlin-Carpathian Mechanized Brigade
- 19th Guards Mechanized Brigade

=== Bangladesh ===
- President Guard Regiment

=== Bhutan ===
- Royal Bodyguard of Bhutan

=== Bulgaria ===
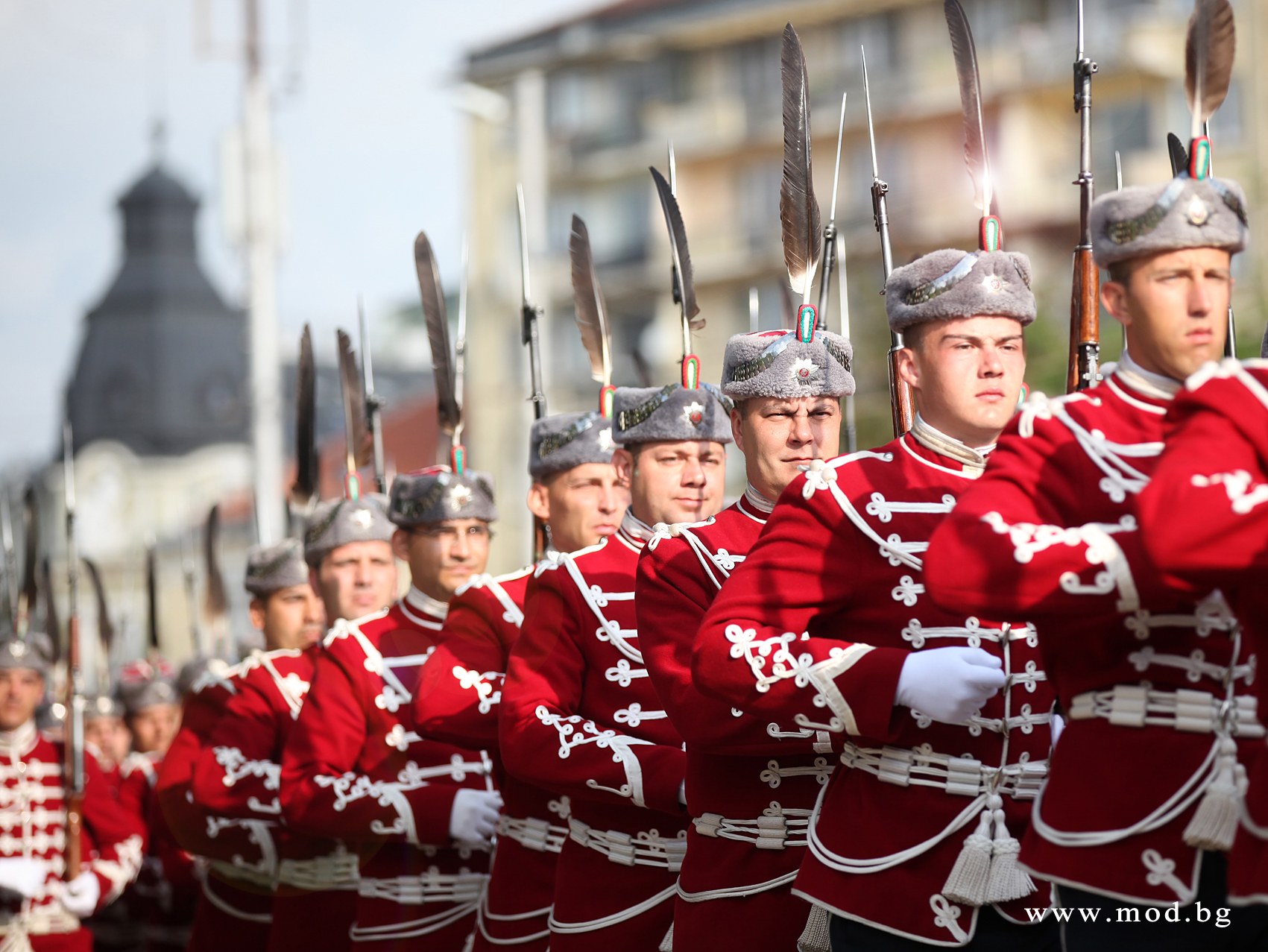
The National Guards Unit of Bulgaria on parade

- National Guards Unit of Bulgaria, elite military unit of the Bulgarian Land Forces used for ceremonial and special duties.

=== Canada ===
- Governor General's Foot Guards
- The Governor General's Horse Guards
- The Canadian Grenadier Guards

=== China ===
- PLA Beijing Garrison
  - 1st Guard Division
    - Central Guard Corps
    - Beijing Garrison Honor Guard Battalion
  - 3rd Guard Division
  - 17th Guard Regiment

=== Denmark ===
- Royal Life Guards
- Guard Hussar Regiment Mounted Squadron

=== Estonia ===
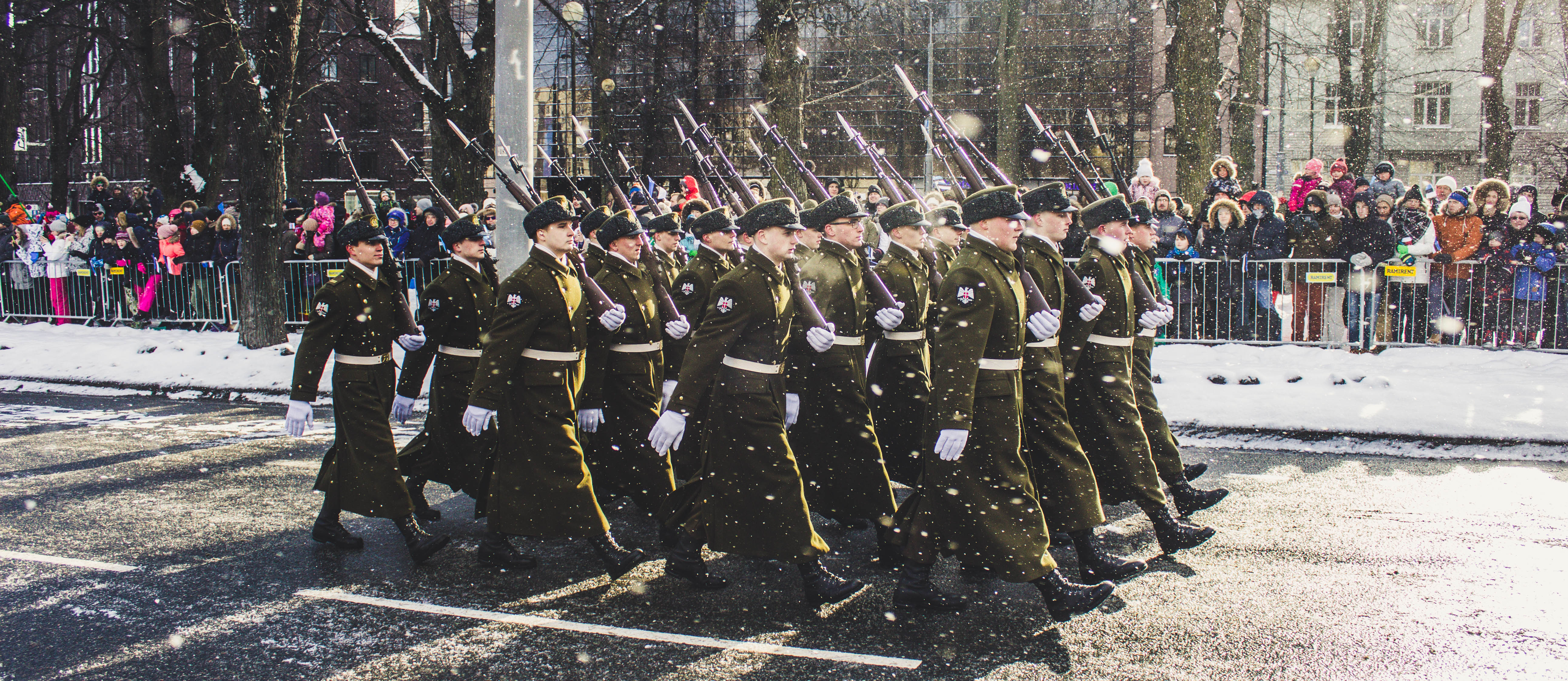
Estonia's Military Police Guard Battalion during the Estonia 100 parade in 2018

- Military Police Guard Battalion

=== Finland ===
- Guard Jaeger Regiment

=== Germany ===
- Wachbataillon

=== India ===
- Brigade of the Guards
- President's Bodyguard

=== Iran ===
- Islamic Revolutionary Guard Corps

=== Israel ===
- Knesset Guard (Hebrew: Mishmar HaKnesset) responsible for the security of the Knesset building and the protection of its members (MKs).

=== Jordan ===
- Royal Guard Brigade

=== Kazakhstan ===
- 35th Guards Air Assault Brigade
- 210th Guards Training Center
- 390th Guards Naval Infantry Brigade

=== Montenegro ===
- Honour Guard Company

=== Morocco ===
- Moroccan Royal Guard

=== Netherlands ===
- Garderegiment Fuseliers Prinses Irene
- Grenadiers' and Rifles Guard Regiment

=== North Korea ===
==== Guard units ====
- Central Committee of the Workers' Party of Korea 6th Office (Guard Office)
- State Affairs Commission Security Bureau
- Central Committee of the WPK Security Department
- KPA Military Security Command
- Guards Seoul Ryu Kyong Su 105th Armored Division
- Guards 1st Infantry Division
- Guards Kang Kon 2nd Infantry Division
- Guards Seoul 3rd Infantry Division
- Guards Seoul Kim Chaek 4th Infantry Division
- Guards 6th Infantry Division
- Andong Choe Chun Guk 12th Infantry Division
- Guards 10th Infantry Regiment
- Guards 14th Infantry Regiment
- Guards Ri Hun 18th Infantry Regiment
- Guards 86th Infantry Regiment
- Guards 19th Anti-Aircraft Artillery Regiment
- Guards 23rd Anti-Aircraft Artillery Regiment
- Guards 26th Anti-Aircraft Artillery Regiment
- Guards 2nd Torpedo Boat Fleet
- Guards 1st Air Division
- Guards Hero Kim Ji Sang 56th Fighter Regiment
- Guards 60th Fighter Regiment
- Guards 1st Construction Brigade

==== Units with the word guards ====
- Worker-Peasant Red Guards
- Youth Red Guards
- Supreme Guard Command - also known as KPA Unit 963

=== Norway ===
- His Majesty the King's Guard

=== Oman ===
- Royal Guard of Oman

=== Philippines ===
Guard Battalion, Presidential Security Command

=== Romania ===
- 30th Honor Guard Brigade "Mihai Viteazul"

=== Russia ===
The Armed Forces of the Russian Federation has a large number of Guards units.

=== Saudi Arabia ===
- Saudi Royal Guard Regiment

=== Serbia ===
- Guard, unit of the Serbian Armed Forces used for ceremonial duties.

=== Singapore ===
- Guards, light infantry units of the Singapore Army

=== Slovenia ===
- Slovenian Guards Unit

=== South Korea ===
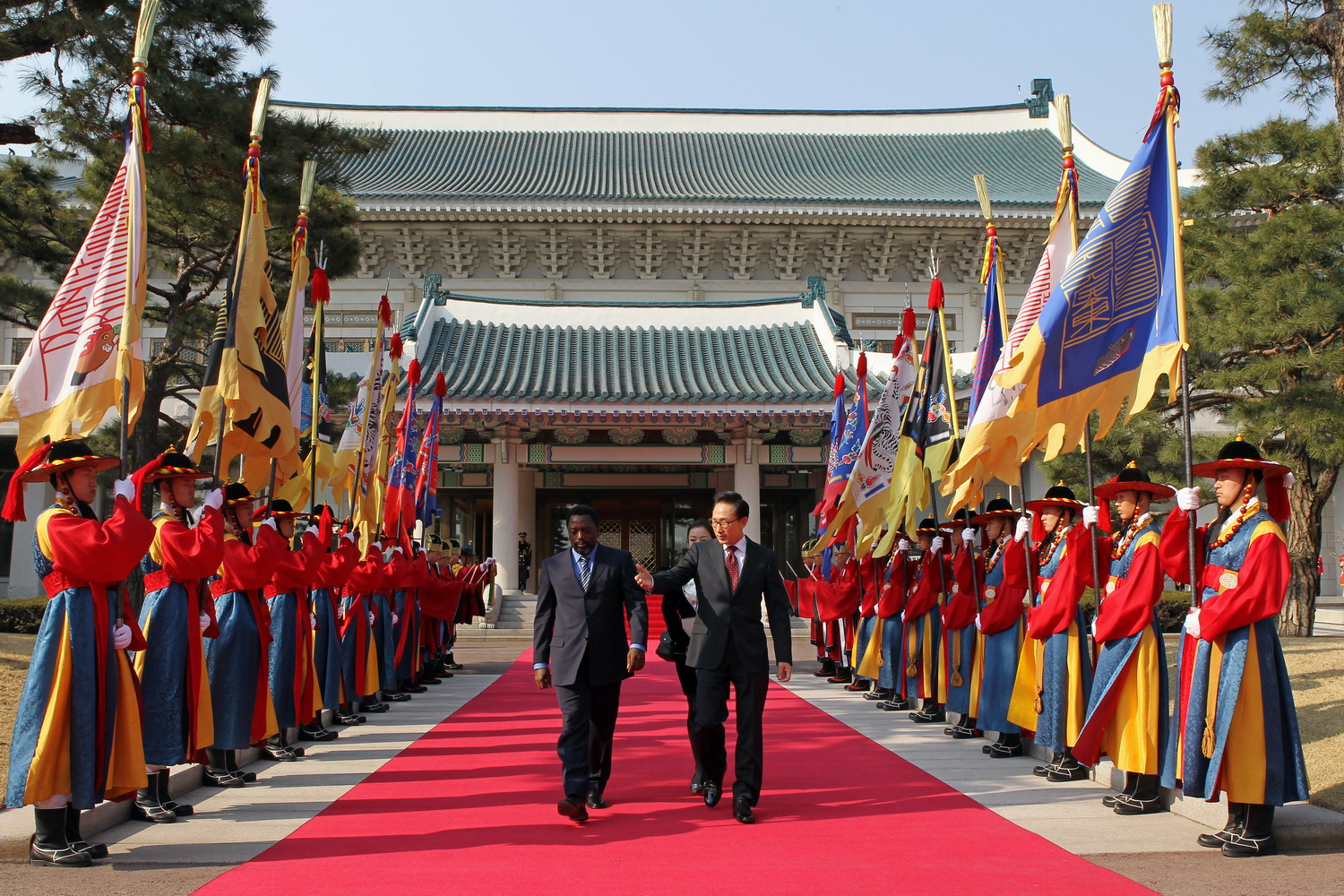
Democratic Republic of Congo president Joseph Kabila and South Korean president Lee Myung-bak walk through an honour guard cordon formed by South Korea's Traditional Guard of Honour Unit, 2010

- Honor Guard Company, Republic of Korea Army
  - Traditional Guard of Honour Unit, 3rd Infantry Division
- Honor Guard Company, Republic of Korea Air Force
- Honor Guard Company, Republic of Korea Navy
  - Honor Guard Company, Republic of Korea Marine Corps

=== Spain ===
- Guardia Real
- Guardia Mora
- "Old Guard of Castille" Honor Guard Battalion and Regimental Band, Infantry Regiment "Inmemorial del Rey" No. 1

=== Sweden ===
- Life Guards

=== Switzerland ===
- Swiss Guard, Swiss mercenary soldiers who served as guards at foreign European courts.

=== Taiwan ===
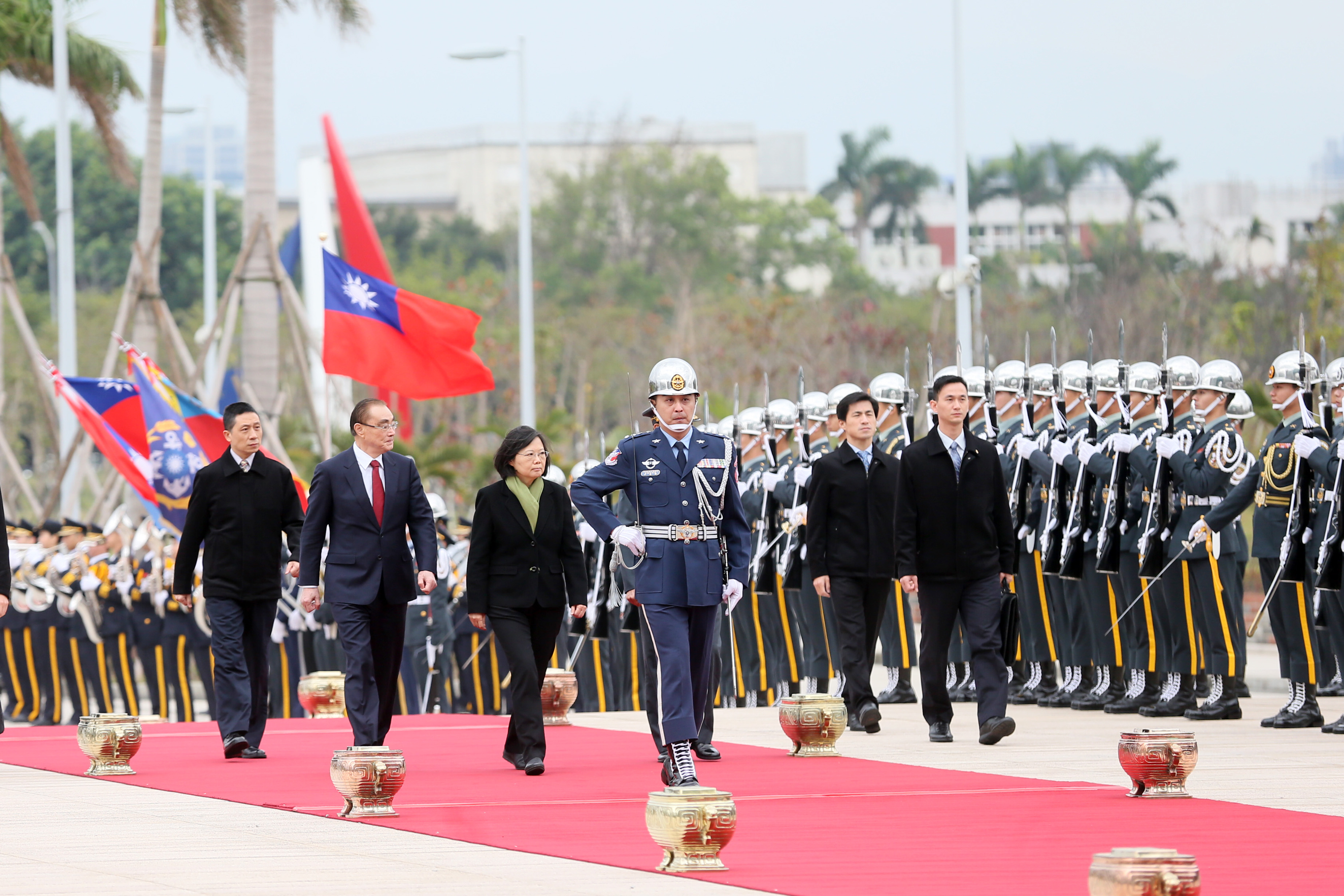
Taiwanese president Tsai Ing-wen inspects a joint-services guard of honour, made up of personnel from the Republic of China army, air force, and navy, 2017

- Honour Guard Company, Army HQ, Republic of China Army
- Honour Guard Company, ROC Air Force Air Defense Artillery Command, Republic of China Air Force
- Fleet Honour Guard, Republic of China Navy
  - Honour Guard Company, Corps HQ Battalion, Republic of China Marine Corps
- Republic of China Police Honour Guard (中華民國警察儀隊)

=== Thailand ===
- King's Guard (ceremonial designation given to units from the three branches of service)

=== United Kingdom ===
- Household Division
  - Foot Guards
    - Grenadier Guards
    - Coldstream Guards
    - Scots Guards
    - Irish Guards
    - Welsh Guards
  - Household Cavalry
    - Life Guards
    - Blues and Royals (Royal Horse Guards and 1st Dragoons)
- Royal Armoured Corps
  - 1st The Queen's Dragoon Guards
  - Royal Dragoon Guards
  - Royal Scots Dragoon Guards

=== United States ===
- Marine Embassy Guards
- National Guard (United States)
  - Royal Guards of Hawaii, a ceremonial guard unit of the Hawaii Air National Guard

=== Vietnam ===
- Vietnam People's Army:
  - Vietnam Border Guard: border protection
  - Vietnam Coast Guard: coast protection
- General Staff of the Vietnam People's Army:
  - 144th Guarding Brigade: protective guards of Ministry of Defense headquarter, General Staff headquarter as well as national and international conferences
  - Military Honor Guard Unit: honor guard during visits of foreign leaders, National Day parade, Military Memory days...
- Ministry of Defense:
  - Command of Ho Chi Minh Mausoleum Guard: protection of Ho Chi Minh Mausoleum

== Historical ==
=== Bavaria ===
- Royal Bavarian Life Guards

=== Byzantine ===
- Varangian Guard, a unit of the Byzantine emperor chiefly made up of troops of Scandinavian and North West European origin.

=== Canada ===
- 4th Princess Louise Dragoon Guards
- Canadian Guards

=== China ===
- Imperial Guards (Qing dynasty)
- Imperial Guards (Tang dynasty)
- Manchukuo Imperial Guards
- 3rd Interior Guard Division
- 4th Guard Division

=== East Germany ===
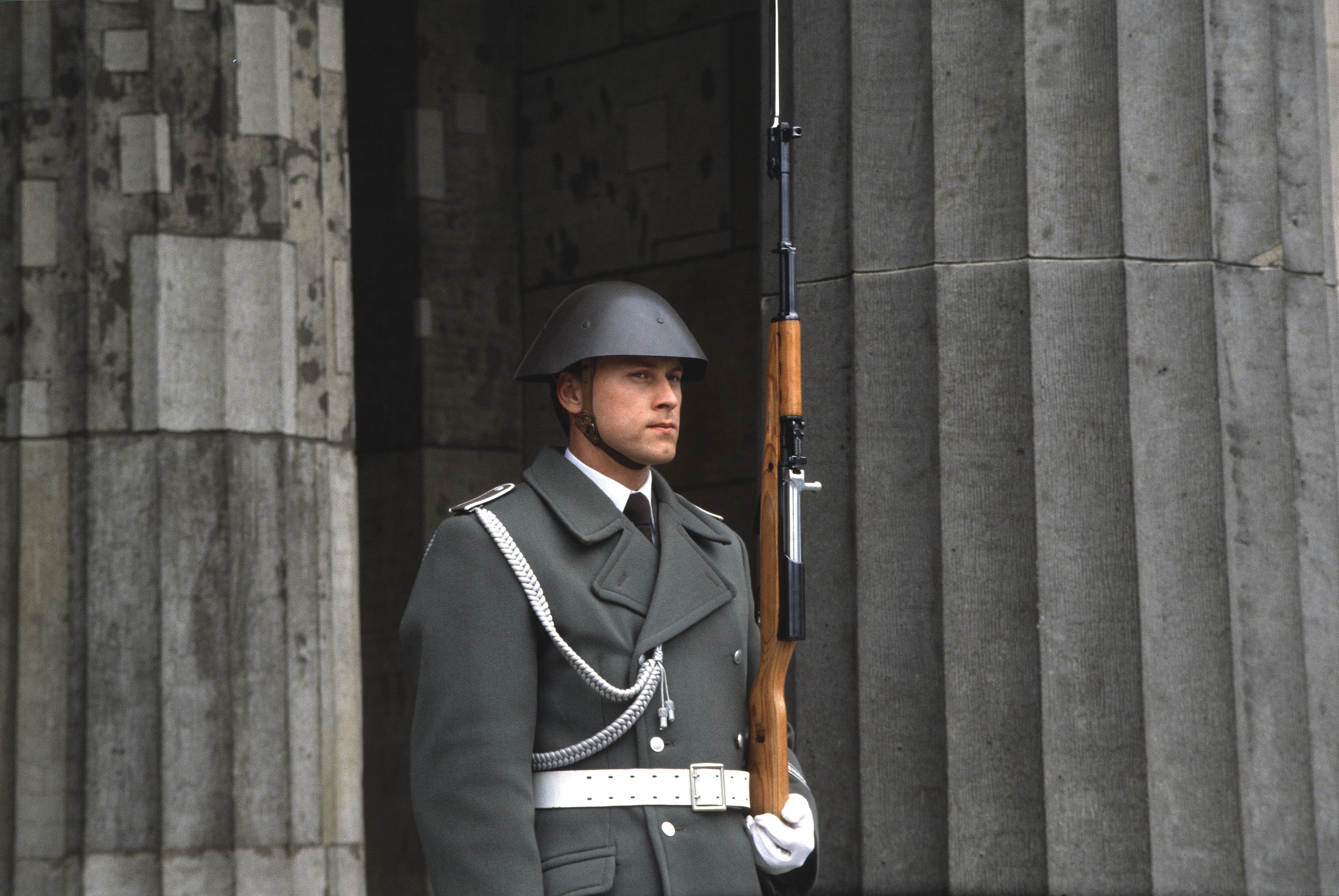
Friedrich Engels Guard Regiment

- Felix Dzerzhinsky Guards Regiment
- Friedrich Engels Guard Regiment
- Guard Regiment Hugo Eberlein

=== Ethiopia ===
- Mehal Sefari ("Center Campers")
- Kebur Zabagna ("Honorable Guard")

=== Finland ===
For Guards units before 1918, see Russian Empire.

=== France ===
- Maison militaire du roi de France
  - Garde du Corps
    - Garde Écossaise
  - Mousquetaires de la Garde
- Imperial Guard (Napoleon I)
  - 1st Polish Light Cavalry Regiment of the Imperial Guard
  - 2e régiment de chevau-légers lanciers de la Garde Impériale
  - Chasseurs à Cheval de la Garde Impériale
  - Dragons de la Garde Impériale
  - Éclaireurs of the Guard
  - Gendarmes d'élite de la Garde Impériale
  - Grenadiers à Cheval de la Garde Impériale
  - Lithuanian Tartars of the Imperial Guard
  - Mamelukes of the Imperial Guard
- Imperial Guard (Napoleon III)
  - Cent-gardes Squadron

=== German Reich ===
- Guards Corps
  - Guards Cavalry Division
  - 1st Guards Infantry Division
  - 2nd Guards Infantry Division
- Guards Reserve Corps
  - 3rd Guards Infantry Division
  - 1st Guards Reserve Division
- 4th Guards Infantry Division
  - 5th Guards Infantry Brigade
  - Guards Reserve Uhlans
  - 2nd Guards Field Artillery
- 5th Guards Infantry Division
- 2nd Guards Reserve Division
- Guard Ersatz Division
- Waffen-SS (German Armed Elite Guards)

=== Iran ===
- Imperial Guard

=== Iraq ===
- Iraqi Republican Guard
- Iraqi Special Republican Guard

=== Imperial Japan ===
- Konoe Shidan (近衛師団) of the Imperial Japanese Army, 1867–1945.

=== Joseon Korea ===
- Wanggung Sumunjang (Korean: 왕궁수문장; Hanja: 王宮守門將)

=== Morocco ===
- Black Guard

=== Philippines ===
- AFP Presidential Guards Battalion
- Malacanang Guards
- Presidential Guard Corps

=== Prussia ===
- Guards Corps

==== Cavalry ====
- Gardes du Corps, also known as the "Prussian Guard" a Prussian formation until 1918
- Guards Cuirassier Regiment
- 1st (Queen Victoria of Great Britain and Ireland) Guards Dragoons
- 2nd (Empress Alexandra of Russia) Guards Dragoons
- 1st Guards Uhlans
- 2nd Guards Uhlans
- 3rd Guards Uhlans
- Life Guards Hussars

==== Infantry ====
Each of the foot guards and four of the guards grenadiers would form reserve (Landwehr) units upon mobilization in August 1914.

- 1st Foot Guards
- 2nd Foot Guards
- 3rd Foot Guards
- 4th Foot Guards
- 5th Foot Guards
- 1st (Emperor Alexander) Guards Grenadiers
- 2nd (Emperor Francis) Guards Grenadiers
- 3rd (Queen Elizabeth) Guards Grenadiers
- 4th (Queen Augusta) Guards Grenadiers
- 5th Guards Grenadiers
- Guards Fusiliers
- Guards Jäger Battalion
- Palace Guards Company
- 1st Guards Machine Gun Detachment
- 2nd Guards Machine Gun Detachment

==== Artillery ====
- 1st Guards Field Artillery
- 2nd Guards Field Artillery
- 3rd Guards Field Artillery
- 4th Guards Field Artillery
- Guards Foot Artillery

==== Support units ====
- Guards Engineers
- Guards Trains

=== Papal States ===
- Corsican Guard
- Noble Guard
- Palatine Guard

=== Poland ===
- Royal Guards

=== Portugal ===
- Royal Guard of the Archers

=== Roman Empire ===
- Praetorian Guard

=== Romania ===
- 2nd Vânători Guard Regiment "Queen Elisabeta"
- 2nd Guard Aviation Flotilla
- 4th Roșiori Guard Regiment "Queen Maria"
- 6th Dorobanți Guard Regiment
- Royal Guard Battalion

=== Russian Empire ===
- Imperial Guard
  - 1st Guard Cavalry Division
  - 1st Guards Infantry Division
  - 2nd Guard Cavalry division
  - 3rd Guard Infantry Division
  - Chevalier Guard Regiment
  - Egersky Guards Regiment
  - Finland Guard Regiment
  - Finnish Guards' Rifle Battalion
  - Moscow Guard Regiment

=== Saxony ===
- 1st Royal Saxon Guards Heavy Cavalry

=== Soviet Union ===
- Guards unit, a type of military unit of the former Soviet Union

=== Spanish Netherlands ===
- Walloon Guards

=== Sri Lanka ===
Army

- President's Guard

Army reserve

- Sri Lanka National Guard

=== Sweden ===
- Life Guards of Horse (K 1)
- Life Guards Squadron (K 1)
- Life Guard Dragoons (K 1)
- Svea Life Guards (I 1)
- Göta Life Guards (I 2), an infantry regiment 1742–1939
- Göta Life Guards (P 1), an armoured regiment 1943–1980
- Finnish Guards

=== United Kingdom ===
- 1st Regiment of Life Guards
- 2nd Regiment of Life Guards
- Royal Horse Guards - predecessor unit to the Blues and Royals
- 1st King's Dragoon Guards -1959
- 2nd Dragoon Guards (Queen's Bays) -1922
- 3rd Dragoon Guards (Prince of Wales's) 1746-1922
- 4th Royal Irish Dragoon Guards -1922
- 5th (Princess Charlotte of Wales's) Dragoon Guards 1788-1922
- Carabiniers (6th Dragoon Guards) 1788-1922
- 7th (The Princess Royal's) Dragoon Guards -1922
- 1st The Queen's Dragoon Guards 1959-
- 3rd Carabiniers (Prince of Wales's Dragoon Guards) 1922-1971 (also known as "3rd/6th Dragoon Guards")
- 4th/7th Royal Dragoon Guards 1922-1992
- 5th Royal Inniskilling Dragoon Guards 1922-1993
- Horse Grenadier Guards 1687 - 1788
- Horse Guards Regiment - a number of temporary regiments carried this name.
  - 1st Troop of Horse Guards
- Guards Machine Gun Regiment
- Royal Guards Reserve Regiment

Organizational units

- Brigade of Guards
- Guards Division
- Guards Armoured Division
- 1st Guards Brigade
- 2nd Guards Brigade
- 3rd Guards Brigade
- 4th Guards Brigade
- 5th Guards Armoured Brigade 1941-1945 (later 5th Guards Brigade)
- 6th Guards Tank Brigade (United Kingdom) 1941-1945 (later 6th Guards Brigade)
- 20th Independent Infantry Brigade (Guards)
- 22nd Guards Brigade
- 32nd Guards Infantry Brigade 1941-1945

=== Vatican ===
- Noble Guard

=== Vietnam ===
- Red Guards (Tự vệ Đỏ) is the precursor force of Vietnam's today police. The Red Guards were formed by Indochinese Communist Party in 1930 - 1931, during Nghệ-Tĩnh uprising against French rule.

== See also ==
- List of Jäger units
