= List of Imperial German infantry regiments =

This is a list of Imperial German infantry regiments before and during World War I. In peacetime, the Imperial German Army included 217 regiments of infantry (plus the instruction unit, Lehr Infantry Battalion). Some of these regiments had a history stretching back to the 17th century, while others were only formed as late as October 1912.

== Pre-war ==
Regiment	Raised	Garrison	Corps
1st Foot Guards	11 August 1688	Potsdam	Guards Corps
2nd Foot Guards	19 June 1813	Berlin	Guards Corps
3rd Foot Guards	5 May 1860	Berlin	Guards Corps
4th Foot Guards	5 May 1860	Berlin	Guards Corps
5th Foot Guards	31 March 1897	Spandau	Guards Corps
1st (Emperor Alexander) Guards Grenadiers	14 October 1814	Berlin	Guards Corps
2nd (Emperor Francis) Guards Grenadiers	14 October 1814	Berlin	Guards Corps
3rd (Queen Elizabeth) Guards Grenadiers	5 May 1860	Charlottenburg	Guards Corps
4th (Queen Augusta) Guards Grenadiers	5 May 1860	Berlin	Guards Corps
5th Guards Grenadiers	31 March 1897	Spandau	Guards Corps
Guards Fusiliers	30 March 1826	Berlin	Guards Corps
Lehr Infantry Regiment	1819	Potsdam	Guards Corps
1st (1st East Prussian) Grenadiers "Crown Prince"	20 December 1655	Königsberg/Pr.	I Army Corps
2nd (1st Pomeranian) Grenadiers "King Frederick William IV"	20 February 1679	Stettin	II Army Corps
3rd (2nd East Prussian) Grenadiers "King Frederick William I"	18 August 1685	Königsberg/Pr.	I Army Corps
4th (3rd East Prussian) Grenadiers "King Frederick the Great"	1 May 1626	Rastenburg	I Army Corps
5th (4th East Prussian) Grenadiers "King Frederick I"	11 March 1689	Danzig	XVII Army Corps
6th (1st West Prussian) Grenadiers "Count Kleist von Nollendorf"	14 October 1772	Posen	V Army Corps
7th (2nd West Prussian) Grenadiers "King William I"	20 February 1797	Liegnitz	V Army Corps
8th (1st Brandenburg) Life Grenadiers "King Frederick William III"	21 November 1808	Frankfurt an der Oder	III Army Corps
9th (2nd Pomeranian) Colberg Grenadiers "Count Gneisenau"	7 June 1808	Stargard	II Army Corps
10th (1st Silesian) Grenadiers "King Frederick William II"	21 November 1808	Schweidnitz	VI Army Corps
11th (2nd Silesian) Grenadiers "King Frederick III"	21 November 1808	Breslau	VI Army Corps
12th (2nd Brandenburg) Grenadiers "Prince Charles of Prussia"	1 July 1813	Frankfurt an der Oder	III Army Corps
13th (1st Westphalian) Infantry "Herwarth von Bittenfeld"	1 July 1813	Münster	VII Army Corps
14th (3rd Pomeranian) Infantry "Count Schwerin"	1 July 1813	Bromberg	II Army Corps
15th (2nd Westphalian) Infantry "Prince Frederick of the Netherlands"	1 July 1813	Minden	VII Army Corps
16th (3rd Westphalian) Infantry "Baron Sparr"	1 July 1813	Cologne	VII Army Corps
17th (4th Westphalian) Infantry "Count Barfuss"	1 July 1813	Mörchingen	XXI Army Corps
18th (1st Posen) Infantry "von Grolman"	1 July 1813	Osterode	XX Army Corps
19th (2nd Posen) Infantry "von Courbière"	1 July 1813	Görlitz, Lauban	V Army Corps
20th (3rd Brandenburg) Infantry "Count Tauentzien von Wittenberg"	1 July 1813	Wittenberg	III Army Corps
21st (4th Pomeranian) Infantry "von Borcke"	1 July 1813	Thorn	XVII Army Corps
22nd (1st Upper Silesian) Infantry "Keith"	1 July 1813	Gleiwitz, Kattowitz	VI Army Corps
23rd (2nd Upper Silesian) Infantry "von Winterfeldt"	1 July 1813	Neisse	VI Army Corps
24th (4th Brandenburg) Infantry "Grand Duke Frederick Francis II of Mecklenburg-Schwerin"	1 July 1813	Neuruppin	III Army Corps
25th (1st Rhenish) Infantry "von Lützow"	18 December 1813	Aachen	VIII Army Corps
26th (1st Magdeburg) Infantry "Prince Leopold of Anhalt-Dessau"	5 July 1813	Magdeburg	IV Army Corps
27th (2nd Magdeburg) Infantry "Prince Louis Ferdinand of Prussia"	7 March 1815	Halberstadt	IV Army Corps
28th (2nd Rhenish) Infantry "von Goeben"	5 December 1813	Koblenz	VIII Army Corps
29th (3rd Rhenish) Infantry "von Horn"	5 December 1813	Trier	VIII Army Corps
30th (4th Rhenish) Infantry "Count Werder"	6 September 1812	Saarlouis	XVI Army Corps
31st (1st Thuringian) Infantry "Count Bose"	6 September 1812	Altona	IX Army Corps
32nd (2nd Thuringian) Infantry	7 March 1815	Meiningen	XI Army Corps
33rd (East Prussian) Fusiliers "Count Roon"	6 March 1749	Gumbinnen	I Army Corps
34th (Pomeranian) Fusiliers "Queen Victoria of Sweden"	12 October 1720	Stettin, Swinemünde	II Army Corps
35th (Brandenburg) Fusiliers "Prince Henry of Prussia"	13 December 1815	Brandenburg	III Army Corps
36th (Magdeburg) Fusiliers "General Field Marshal Count Blumenthal"	13 December 1815	Halle, Bernburg	IV Army Corps
37th (West Prussian) Fusiliers "von Steinmetz"	26 January 1818	Krotoschin	V Army Corps
38th (Silesian) Fusiliers "General Field Marshal Count Moltke"	26 January 1818	Glatz	VI Army Corps
39th (Lower Rhenish) Fusiliers	26 January 1818	Düsseldorf	VII Army Corps
40th (Hohenzollern) Fusiliers "Prince Charles Anton of Hohenzollern"	26 January 1818	Rastatt	XIV Army Corps
41st (5th East Prussian) Infantry "von Boyen"	5 May 1860	Tilsit, Memel	I Army Corps
42nd (5th Pomeranian) Infantry "Prince Maurice of Anhalt-Dessau"	5 May 1860	Stralsund, Greifswald	II Army Corps
43rd (6th East Prussian) Infantry "Duke Charles of Mecklenburg"	5 May 1860	Königsberg, Pillau	I Army Corps
44th (7th East Prussian) Infantry "Count Dönhoff"	5 May 1860	Goldap	I Army Corps
45th (8th East Prussian) Infantry	5 May 1860	Insterburg, Darkehmen	I Army Corps
46th (1st Lower Silesian) Infantry "Count Kirchbach"	5 May 1860	Posen, Wreschen	V Army Corps
47th (2nd Lower Silesian) Infantry "King Ludwig III of Bavaria"	5 May 1860	Posen, Schrimm	V Army Corps
48th (5th Brandenburg) Infantry "von Stülpnagel"	5 May 1860	Küstrin	III Army Corps
49th (6th Pomeranian) Infantry	5 May 1860	Gnesen	II Army Corps
50th (3rd Lower Silesian) Infantry	5 May 1860	Rawitsch, Lissa	V Army Corps
51st (4th Lower Silesian) Infantry	5 May 1860	Breslau	VI Army Corps
52nd (6th Brandenburg) Infantry "von Alvensleben"	5 May 1860	Cottbus, Crossen	III Army Corps
53rd (5th Westphalian) Infantry	5 May 1860	Köln	VII Army Corps
54th (7th Pomeranian) Infantry "von der Goltz"	5 May 1860	Kolberg, Köslin	II Army Corps
55th (6th Westphalian) Infantry "Count Bülow von Dennewitz"	5 May 1860	Detmold, Höxter, Bielefeld	VII Army Corps
56th (7th Westphalian) Infantry "Vogel von Falkenstein"	5 May 1860	Wesel, Kleve	VII Army Corps
57th (8th Westphalian) Infantry "Duke Ferdinand of Brunswick"	5 May 1860	Wesel	VII Army Corps
58th (3rd Posen) Infantry	5 May 1860	Glogau, Fraustadt	V Army Corps
59th (4th Posen) Infantry "Baron Hiller von Gaertringen"	5 May 1860	Deutsch-Eylau, Soldau	XX Army Corps
60th (7th Brandenburg) Infantry "Margrave Charles"	5 May 1860	Weißenburg	XXI Army Corps
61st (8th Pomeranian) Infantry "von der Marwitz"	5 May 1860	Thorn	XVII Army Corps
62nd (3rd Upper Silesian) Infantry	5 May 1860	Cosel, Ratibor	VI Army Corps
63rd (4th Upper Silesian) Infantry	5 May 1860	Oppeln, Lublinitz	VI Army Corps
64th (8th Brandenburg) Infantry "General Field Marshal Prince Frederick Charles of Prussia"	5 May 1860	Prenzlau, Angermünde	III Army Corps
65th (5th Rhenish) Infantry	5 May 1860	Köln	VIII Army Corps
66th (3rd Magdeburg) Infantry	5 May 1860	Magdeburg	IV Army Corps
67th (4th Magdeburg) Infantry	5 May 1860	Metz	XVI Army Corps
68th (6th Rhenish) Infantry	5 May 1860	Koblenz	VIII Army Corps
69th (7th Rhenish) Infantry	5 May 1860	Trier	VIII Army Corps
70th (8th Rhenish) Infantry	5 May 1860	Saarbrücken	XXI Army Corps
71st (3rd Thuringian) Infantry	5 May 1860	Erfurt, Sondershausen	XI Army Corps
72nd (4th Thuringian) Infantry	5 May 1860	Torgau, Altenburg	IV Army Corps
73rd (Hannover) Fusiliers "Field Marshal Prince Albrecht of Prussia"	19 December 1803	Hannover	X Army Corps
74th (1st Hannover) Infantry	27 November 1813	Hannover	X Army Corps
75th (1st Hanseatic)(Bremen) Infantry	27 September 1866	Bremen, Stade	IX Army Corps
76th (2nd Hanseatic)(Hamburg) Infantry	27 September 1866	Hamburg	IX Army Corps
77th (2nd Hannover) Infantry	26 March 1813	Celle	X Army Corps
78th (East Frisian) Infantry "Duke Frederick William of Brunswick"	30 November 1813	Osnabrück, Aurich	X Army Corps
79th (3rd Hannover) Infantry "von Voigts-Rhetz"	3 January 1838	Hildesheim	X Army Corps
80th (Kurhessian) Fusiliers "von Gersdorff"	22 November 1813	Wiesbaden, Homburg	XVIII Army Corps
81st (1st Kurhessian) Infantry "Landgrave Frederick I of Hesse-Cassel"	5 December 1813	Frankfurt am Main	XVIII Army Corps
82nd (2nd Kurhessian) Infantry	30 November 1813	Göttingen	XI Army Corps
83rd (3rd Kurhessian) Infantry "von Wittich"	22 November 1813	Kassel, Arolsen	XI Army Corps
84th (Schleswig) Infantry "von Manstein"	27 September 1866	Schleswig, Hadersleben	IX Army Corps
85th (Holstein) Infantry "Duke of Holstein"	27 September 1866	Rendsburg, Kiel	IX Army Corps
86th (Schleswig-Holstein) Fusiliers "Queen"	27 September 1866	Flensburg, Sonderburg	IX Army Corps
87th (1st Nassau) Infantry	14 March 1809	Mainz	XVIII Army Corps
88th (2nd Nassau) Infantry	13 August 1808	Mainz, Hanau	XVIII Army Corps
89th (Grand Ducal Mecklenburgian) Grenadiers	3 April 1782	Schwerin, Neustrelitz	IX Army Corps
90th (Grand Ducal Mecklenburgian) Fusiliers "Emperor William"	12 July 1788	Rostock, Wismar	IX Army Corps
91st (Oldenburg) Infantry	5 December 1813	Oldenburg	X Army Corps
92nd (Brunswick) Infantry	1 April 1809	Braunschweig	X Army Corps
93rd (Anhalt) Infantry	22 May 1807	Dessau, Zerbst	IV Army Corps
94th (5th Thuringian) Infantry "Grand Duke of Saxony"	28 October 1762	Weimar, Eisenach, Jena	XI Army Corps
95th (6th Thuringian) Infantry	18 July 1807	Gotha, Hildburghausen, Coburg	XI Army Corps
96th (7th Thuringian) Infantry	1 October 1867	Gera, Rudolstadt	XI Army Corps
97th (1st Upper Rhenish) Infantry	24 March 1881	Saarburg	XXI Army Corps
98th (Metz) Infantry	24 March 1881	Metz	XVI Army Corps
99th (2nd Upper Rhenish) Infantry	24 March 1881	Zabern, Pfalzburg	XV Army Corps
100th (1st Royal Saxon) Life Grenadiers	30 April 1670	Dresden	XII Army Corps
101st (2nd Royal Saxon) Grenadiers "Emperor William, King of Prussia"	30 April 1670	Dresden	XII Army Corps
102nd (3rd Royal Saxon) Infantry "King Ludwig III of Bavaria"	14 June 1709	Zittau	XII Army Corps
103rd (4th Royal Saxon) Infantry	14 June 1709	Bautzen	XII Army Corps
104th (5th Royal Saxon) Infantry "Crown Prince"	7 December 1701	Chemnitz	XIX Army Corps
105th (6th Royal Saxon) Infantry "King William II of Württemberg"	7 December 1701	Straßburg	XV Army Corps
106th (7th Royal Saxon) Infantry "King George"	2 June 1708	Leipzig	XIX Army Corps
107th (8th Royal Saxon) Infantry "Prince John George"	2 June 1708	Leipzig	XIX Army Corps
108th (Royal Saxon) Schützen (Füsiliers) "Prince George"	1 October 1809	Dresden	XII Army Corps
109th (1st Baden) Life Grenadiers	23 March 1803	Karlsruhe	XIV Army Corps
110th (2nd Baden) Grenadiers "Emperor William I"	22 October 1852	Mannheim, Heidelberg	XIV Army Corps
111th (3rd Baden) Infantry "Margrave Ludwig William"	22 October 1852	Rastatt	XIV Army Corps
112th (4th Baden) Infantry "Prince William"	22 October 1852	Mülhausen/Elsaß	XIV Army Corps
113th (5th Baden) Infantry	16 February 1861	Freiburg im Breisgau	XIV Army Corps
114th (6th Baden) Infantry "Emperor Frederick III"	26 October 1867	Konstanz	XIV Army Corps
115th (1st Grand Ducal Hessian) Lifeguard Infantry	1 March 1621	Darmstadt	XVIII Army Corps
116th (2nd Grand Ducal Hessian) Infantry "Emperor William"	17 June 1813	Gießen	XVIII Army Corps
117th (3rd Grand Ducal Hessian) Life Infantry "Grand Duchess"	10 June 1697	Mainz	XVIII Army Corps
118th (4th Grand Ducal Hessian) Infantry "Prince Charles"	23 January 1791	Worms	XVIII Army Corps
119th (1st Württemberg) Grenadiers "Queen Olga"	1673	Stuttgart	XIII Army Corps
120th (2nd Württemberg) Infantry "Emperor William, King of Prussia"	1 June 1673	Ulm	XIII Army Corps
121st (3rd Württemberg)(Old Württemberg) Infantry	18 March 1716	Ludwigsburg	XIII Army Corps
122nd (4th Württemberg) Fusiliers "Emperor Francis Joseph of Austria, King of Hungary"	10 November 1806	Heilbronn, Mergentheim	XIII Army Corps
123rd (5th Württemberg) Grenadiers "King Charles"	17 October 1799	Ulm	XIII Army Corps
124th (6th Württemberg) Infantry "King William I"	1 June 1673	Weingarten	XIII Army Corps
125th (7th Württemberg) Infantry "Emperor Frederick, King of Prussia"	1809	Stuttgart	XIII Army Corps
126th (8th Württemberg) Infantry "Grand Duke Frederick of Baden"	18 March 1706	Straßburg	XV Army Corps
127th (9th Württemberg) Infantry	1 April 1897	Ulm	XIII Army Corps
128th (Danzig) Infantry	24 March 1881	Danzig-Neufahrwasser	XVII Army Corps
129th (3rd West Prussian) Infantry	24 March 1881	Graudenz	XVII Army Corps
130th (1st Lotharingian) Infantry	24 March 1881	Metz	XVI Army Corps
131st (2nd Lotharingian) Infantry	24 March 1881	Mörchingen	XXI Army Corps
132nd (1st Lower Alsatian) Infantry	24 March 1881	Straßburg	XV Army Corps
133rd (9th Royal Saxon) Infantry	1 April 1881	Zwickau	XIX Army Corps
134th (10th Royal Saxon) Infantry	1 April 1881	Plauen	XIX Army Corps
135th (3rd Lotharingian) Infantry	11 March 1887	Diedenhofen	XVI Army Corps
136th (4th Lotharingian) Infantry	11 March 1887	Straßburg	XV Army Corps
137th (2nd Lower Alsatian) Infantry	11 March 1887	Hagenau	XXI Army Corps
138th (3rd Lower Alsatian) Infantry	11 March 1887	Dieuze	XXI Army Corps
139th (11th Royal Saxon) Infantry	1 April 1887	Döbeln	XIX Army Corps
140th (4th West Prussian) Infantry	1 February 1890	Hohensalza	II Army Corps
141st (Kulm) Infantry	1 February 1890	Graudenz, Strasburg in Westpreußen	XVII Army Corps
142nd (7th Baden) Infantry	1 February 1890	Mülhausen/Elsaß, Müllheim/Baden	XIV Army Corps
143rd (4th Lower Alsasian) Infantry	1 February 1890	Straßburg, Mutzig	XV Army Corps
144th (5th Lotharingian) Infantry	1 February 1890	Metz	XVI Army Corps
145th (6th Lotharingian) King's Infantry	28 July 1890	Metz	XVI Army Corps
146th (1st Masurian) Infantry	31 March 1897	Allenstein	XX Army Corps
147th (2nd Masurian) Infantry	31 March 1897	Lyck, Lötzen	XX Army Corps
148th (5th West Prussian) Infantry	31 March 1897	Elbing, Braunsberg	XX Army Corps
149th (6th West Prussian) Infantry	31 March 1897	Schneidemühl, Deutsch-Krone	II Army Corps
150th (1st Ermland) Infantry	31 March 1897	Allenstein	XX Army Corps
151st (2nd Ermland) Infantry	31 March 1897	Sensburg, Bischofsburg	XX Army Corps
152nd (1st Alsasian) Infantry "Teutonic Order"	31 March 1897	Marienburg, Stuhm	XX Army Corps
153rd (8th Thuringian) Infantry	18 December 1897	Altenburg, Merseburg	IV Army Corps
154th (5th Lower Silesian) Infantry	31 March 1897	Jauer, Glogau	V Army Corps
155th (7th West Prussian) Infantry	31 March 1897	Ostrowo, Pleschen	V Army Corps
156th (3rd Silesian) Infantry	31 March 1897	Beuthen, Tarnowitz	VI Army Corps
157th (4th Silesian) Infantry	31 March 1897	Brieg	VI Army Corps
158th (7th Lotharingian) Infantry	31 March 1897	Paderborn	VII Army Corps
159th (8th Lotharingian) Infantry	31 March 1897	Mülheim/Ruhr, Geldern	VII Army Corps
160th (9th Rhenish) Infantry	31 March 1897	Bonn, Dietz, Euskirchen	VIII Army Corps
161st (10th Rhenish) Infantry	31 March 1897	Düren, Eschweiler, Jülich	VIII Army Corps
162nd (3rd Hanseatic)(Lübeck) Infantry	31 March 1897	Lübeck, Eutin	IX Army Corps
163rd (Schleswig-Holstein) Infantry	31 March 1897	Neumünster, Heide	IX Army Corps
164th (4th Hannover) Infantry	24 March 1813	Hameln, Holzminden	X Army Corps
165th (5th Hannover) Infantry	31 March 1813	Quedlinburg, Blankenburg	IV Army Corps
166th (Hessen-Homburg) Infantry	31 March 1897	Bitsch	XXI Army Corps
167th (1st Upper Alsatian) Infantry	31 March 1897	Kassel, Mühlhausen/Thüringen	XI Army Corps
168th (5th Grand Ducal Hessian) Infantry	31 March 1897	Offenbach, Butzbach, Friedberg/Hesse	XVIII Army Corps
169th (8th Baden) Infantry	31 March 1897	Lahr, Villingen	XIV Army Corps
170th (9th Baden) Infantry	31 March 1897	Offenburg, Donaueschingen	XIV Army Corps
171st (2nd Upper Alsatian) Infantry	31 March 1897	Colmar/Elsaß	XV Army Corps
172nd (3rd Upper Alsatian) Infantry	31 March 1897	Neubreisach	XV Army Corps
173rd (9th Lotharingian) Infantry	31 March 1897	St. Avold, Metz	XVI Army Corps
174th (10th Lotharingian) Infantry	31 March 1897	Forbach	XXI Army Corps
175th (8th West Prussian) Infantry	31 March 1897	Graudenz, Schwetz	XVII Army Corps
176th (9th West Prussian) Infantry	31 March 1897	Kulm, Thorn	XVII Army Corps
177th (12th Royal Saxon) Infantry	1 April 1897	Dresden	XII Army Corps
178th (13th Royal Saxon) Infantry	1 April 1897	Kamenz/Sachsen	XII Army Corps
179th (14th Royal Saxon) Infantry	1 April 1897	Wurzen, Leisnig	XIX Army Corps
180th (10th Württemberg) Infantry	1 April 1897	Tübingen, Gmünd	XIII Army Corps
181st (15th Royal Saxon) Infantry	1 April 1900	Chemnitz	XIX Army Corps
182nd (16th Royal Saxon) Infantry	1 October 1912	Freiberg	XII Army Corps
Royal Bavarian Infantry Lifeguards Regiment	16 July 1814	München	I Royal Bavarian Corps
1st Royal Bavarian Infantry "King"	1 July 1778	München	I Royal Bavarian Corps
2nd Royal Bavarian Infantry "Crown Prince"	29 June 1682	München	I Royal Bavarian Corps
3rd Royal Bavarian Infantry "Prince Charles of Bavaria"	1 February 1698	Augsburg	I Royal Bavarian Corps
4th Royal Bavarian Infantry "King William of Württemberg"	1 April 1706	Metz	II Royal Bavarian Corps
5th Royal Bavarian Infantry "Grand Duke Ernst Ludwig of Hessen"	6 August 1722	Bamberg	II Royal Bavarian Corps
6th Royal Bavarian Infantry "Emperor William, King of Prussia"	18 June 1725	Amberg	III Royal Bavarian Corps
7th Royal Bavarian Infantry "Prince Leopold"	27 June 1732	Bayreuth	III Royal Bavarian Corps
8th Royal Bavarian Infantry "Grand Duke Frederick II of Baden"	1 October 1753	Metz	II Royal Bavarian Corps
9th Royal Bavarian Infantry "Wrede"	21 March 1803	Würzburg	II Royal Bavarian Corps
10th Royal Bavarian Infantry "King"	29 June 1682	Ingolstadt	III Royal Bavarian Corps
11th Royal Bavarian Infantry "von der Tann"	1 October 1805	Regensburg	III Royal Bavarian Corps
12th Royal Bavarian Infantry "Prince Arnulf"	16 July 1814	Neu-Ulm	I Royal Bavarian Corps
13th Royal Bavarian Infantry "Franz Josef I, Emperor of Austria and King of Hungary"	31 May 1806	Ingolstadt	III Royal Bavarian Corps
14th Royal Bavarian Infantry "Hartmann"	15 August 1814	Nuremberg	III Royal Bavarian Corps
15th Royal Bavarian Infantry "King Frederick August of Saxony"	4 August 1722	Neuburg an der Donau	I Royal Bavarian Corps
16th Royal Bavarian Infantry "Grand Duke Ferdinand of Tuscany"	1 October 1878	Passau	I Royal Bavarian Corps
17th Royal Bavarian Infantry "Orff"	1 October 1878	Germersheim	II Royal Bavarian Corps
18th Royal Bavarian Infantry "Prince Ludwig Ferdinand"	1 April 1881	Landau	II Royal Bavarian Corps
19th Royal Bavarian Infantry "King Viktor Emanuel III of Italy"	1 October 1890	Erlangen	III Royal Bavarian Corps
20th Royal Bavarian Infantry "Prince Francis"	1 April 1897	Lindau	I Royal Bavarian Corps
21st Royal Bavarian Infantry "Grand Duke Frederick Francis IV of Mecklenburg-Schwerin"	1 April 1897	Fürth, Sulzbach, Eichstätt	III Royal Bavarian Corps
22nd Royal Bavarian Infantry "Prince William of Hohenzollern"	1 April 1897	Zweibrücken	II Royal Bavarian Corps
23rd Royal Bavarian Infantry	1 April 1897	Landau	II Royal Bavarian Corps

== Wartime regiments ==
On mobilisation, the German Army raised 113 Reserve Infantry Regiments (of 332 battalions) and 96 Landwehr Infantry Regiments (of 294 battalions). Meanwhile a number of existing units of various sizes were expanded. The Lehr Infantry Battalion was expanded to form the Lehr Infantry Regiment. Throughout the war Germany also mustered numerous new infantry regiments.

=== Reserve regiments ===
Regiment	Raised	Garrison	Corps
64th Reserve Infantry Regiment	1914		
86th Reserve Infantry Regiment	August 1914		IX Reserve Corps
93rd Reserve Infantry Regiment	1914		
213th Reserve Infantry Regiment	1914		
254th Reserve Infantry Regiment	December 1914		

=== New regiments ===
Regiment	Raised	Garrison	Corps
405th Infantry Regiment	late 1916		
409th Infantry Regiment	2 October 1916		
410th Infantry Regiment	late 1916		

== See also ==
- Bavarian Army
- List of Imperial German artillery regiments
- List of Imperial German cavalry regiments
- List of German Jäger units

== Bibliography ==
- Busche, Hartwig (1998). Formationsgeschichte der Deutschen Infanterie im Ersten Weltkrieg (1914 bis 1918) (in German). Institut für Preußische Historiographie.
- Cron, Hermann (2002) [1937]. Imperial German Army 1914-18: Organisation, Structure, Orders-of-Battle. Helion & Co. ISBN 1-874622-70-1.
- Tessin, Georg (1974). Deutsche Verbände und Truppen, 1918 - 1939. Biblio Osnabrück. ISBN 3-7648-1000-9.
- The German Forces in the Field; 7th Revision, 11th November 1918; Compiled by the General Staff, War Office. Imperial War Museum, London and the Battery Press. 1995 [1918]. ISBN 978-1-870423-95-3.
