= Guards Corps (German Empire) =

Command of the Prussian and then the Imperial German Armies

Guards Corps Gardekorps
- Flag of the Staff of a Generalkommando (1871–1918)
- Active: 1813–1919
- Country: Prussia / German Empire
- Branch: Army
- Type: Artillery; Cavalry; Infantry; Pioneer
- Size: Approximately 44,000 (on mobilisation in 1914)
- Garrison/HQ: Berlin/Hinter dem Gießhause 3
- Patron: German Emperor and King of Prussia
- Motto: Semper talis (always the same/great)
- Shoulder strap piping: Varies per unit
- Engagements: Austro-Prussian War; Battle of Königgrätz; Franco-Prussian War; Battle of Gravelotte; Battle of Sedan (1870); Siege of Paris; Battle of Le Bourget; World War I; Battle of the Frontiers; First Battle of the Marne; First Battle of Ypres

Insignia
- Abbreviation: GK

The Guards Corps/GK (German: Gardekorps) was a corps level command of the Prussian and then the Imperial German Armies from the 19th century to World War I.

The Corps was headquartered in Berlin, with its units garrisoned in the city and nearby towns (Potsdam, Jüterbog, Döberitz). Unlike all other Corps of the Imperial German Army, the Guards Corps did not recruit from a specific area, but from throughout Prussia and the "Imperial Lands" of Alsace-Lorraine.

The Corps served in the Austro-Prussian War. During the Franco-Prussian War it was assigned to the 2nd Army.

In peacetime the Corps was assigned to the II Army Inspectorate but joined the 2nd Army at the start of the First World War. It was still in existence at the end of the war in the 4th Army, Heeresgruppe Kronprinz Rupprecht, on the Western Front. The Corps was disbanded with the demobilisation of the German Army after World War I.

== Austro-Prussian War ==
The Guards Corps fought in the Austro-Prussian War against Austria in 1866, including the Battle of Königgrätz.

== Franco-Prussian War ==
The Corps served in the Franco-Prussian War against France in 1870–1871 as part of 2nd Army. It saw action in the Battle of Gravelotte, Battle of Sedan and the Siege of Paris (including the Battle of Le Bourget), among other actions.

== Peacetime organisation ==
The 25 peacetime Corps of the German Army (Guards, I–XXI, I–III Bavarian) had a reasonably standardised organisation. Each consisted of two divisions with usually two infantry brigades, one field artillery brigade and a cavalry brigade each. Each brigade normally consisted of two regiments of the appropriate type, so each Corps normally commanded eight infantry, four field artillery and four cavalry regiments. There were exceptions to this rule:

V, VI, VII, IX and XIV Corps each had a fifth infantry brigade (so 10 infantry regiments)
II, XIII, XVIII and XXI Corps had a ninth infantry regiment
I, VI and XVI Corps had a 3rd cavalry brigade (so six cavalry regiments)

Each Corps also directly controlled a number of other units. This could include one or more

Foot Artillery Regiment
Jäger Battalion
Pioneer Battalion
Train Battalion

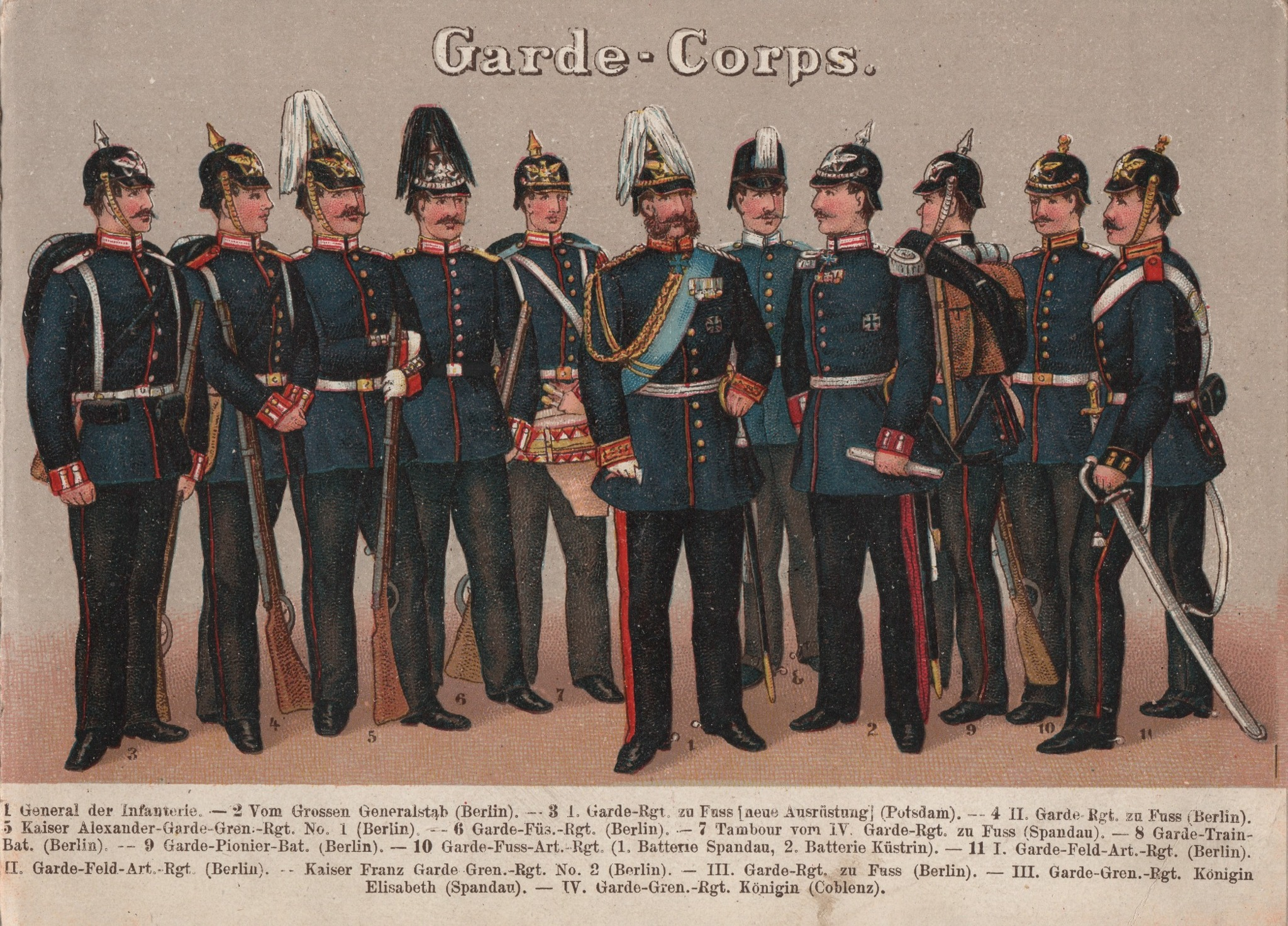
Uniforms of the Guards Corps' infantry and artillery during La Belle Époque

The Guards Corps was considerably above this norm, with 11 infantry regiments (in five brigades) and 8 cavalry regiments (in four brigades). In addition to the normal two infantry divisions (1st Guards Infantry and 2nd Guards Infantry Divisions), the Guards Corps also commanded the Guards Cavalry Division, the only peacetime cavalry division in the German Army. It also incorporated an exceptional number of "Corps Troops" units, in particular school and demonstration (Lehr) units.

Peacetime organization of the Corps
Corps	Division	Brigade	Units	Garrison
Guards Corps	Guards Cavalry Division	1st Guards Cavalry Brigade	Gardes du Corps	Potsdam
Guards Corps	Guards Cavalry Division	1st Guards Cavalry Brigade	Guards Cuirassiers	Berlin
Guards Corps	Guards Cavalry Division	2nd Guards Cavalry Brigade	1st Guards Uhlans	Potsdam
Guards Corps	Guards Cavalry Division	2nd Guards Cavalry Brigade	3rd Guards Uhlans	Potsdam
Guards Corps	Guards Cavalry Division	3rd Guards Cavalry Brigade	1st Guards Dragoons "Queen of Great Britain and Ireland"	Berlin
Guards Corps	Guards Cavalry Division	3rd Guards Cavalry Brigade	2nd Guards Dragoons "Empress Alexandra of Russia"	Berlin
Guards Corps	Guards Cavalry Division	4th Guards Cavalry Brigade	Life Guards Hussars	Potsdam
Guards Corps	Guards Cavalry Division	4th Guards Cavalry Brigade	2nd Guards Uhlans	Berlin
Guards Corps	1st Guards Infantry Division	1st Guards Infantry Brigade	1st Foot Guards	Potsdam
Guards Corps	1st Guards Infantry Division	1st Guards Infantry Brigade	3rd Foot Guards	Berlin
Guards Corps	1st Guards Infantry Division	1st Guards Infantry Brigade	Guards Jäger Battalion	Potsdam
Guards Corps	1st Guards Infantry Division	2nd Guards Infantry Brigade	2nd Foot Guards	Berlin
Guards Corps	1st Guards Infantry Division	2nd Guards Infantry Brigade	4th Foot Guards	Berlin
Guards Corps	1st Guards Infantry Division	2nd Guards Infantry Brigade	Guards Fusiliers	Berlin
Guards Corps	1st Guards Infantry Division	1st Guards Field Artillery Brigade	1st Guards Field Artillery	Berlin
Guards Corps	1st Guards Infantry Division	1st Guards Field Artillery Brigade	3rd Guards Field Artillery	Berlin, Beeskow
Guards Corps	2nd Guards Infantry Division	3rd Guards Infantry Brigade	1st (Emperor Alexander) Guards Grenadiers	Berlin
Guards Corps	2nd Guards Infantry Division	3rd Guards Infantry Brigade	3rd (Queen Elizabeth) Guards Grenadiers	Charlottenburg
Guards Corps	2nd Guards Infantry Division	3rd Guards Infantry Brigade	Guards Schützen Battalion	Groß-Lichterfelde
Guards Corps	2nd Guards Infantry Division	4th Guards Infantry Brigade	2nd (Emperor Francis) Guards Grenadiers	Berlin
Guards Corps	2nd Guards Infantry Division	4th Guards Infantry Brigade	4th (Queen Augusta) Guards Grenadiers	Berlin
Guards Corps	2nd Guards Infantry Division	5th Guards Infantry Brigade	5th Foot Guards	Spandau
Guards Corps	2nd Guards Infantry Division	5th Guards Infantry Brigade	5th Guards Grenadiers	Spandau
Guards Corps	2nd Guards Infantry Division	2nd Guards Field Artillery Brigade	2nd Guards Field Artillery	Potsdam
Guards Corps	2nd Guards Infantry Division	2nd Guards Field Artillery Brigade	4th Guards Field Artillery	Potsdam
Guards Corps	Corps Troops		Lehr Infantry Battalion	Potsdam
Guards Corps	Corps Troops		1st Guards Machine Gun Abteilung	Potsdam
Guards Corps	Corps Troops		2nd Guards Machine Gun Abteilung	Berlin
Guards Corps	Corps Troops		Guards Foot Artillery	Spandau
Guards Corps	Corps Troops		Lehr Regiment of the Field Artillery Firing School	Jüterbog
Guards Corps	Corps Troops		Lehr Regiment of the Foot Artillery Firing School	Jüterbog
Guards Corps	Corps Troops		Guards Pioneer Battalion	Berlin
Guards Corps	Corps Troops		Guards Train Battalion	Berlin
Guards Corps	Corps Troops		1st Railway Regiment	Berlin
Guards Corps	Corps Troops		4th Railway Regiment	Berlin
Guards Corps	Corps Troops		Operating Abteilung of the Railway Troops	Berlin
Guards Corps	Corps Troops		1st Telegraph Battalion	Berlin (Treptow)
Guards Corps	Corps Troops		War Telegraph School	Spandau (Ruheleben)
Guards Corps	Corps Troops		1st Airship Battalion	Berlin (Tegel)
Guards Corps	Corps Troops		2nd Airship Battalion	Berlin / Hannover / Dresden
Guards Corps	Corps Troops		1st Flying Battalion	Döberitz / Großenhain
Guards Corps	Corps Troops		Motorised Battalion	Berlin
Guards Corps	Corps Troops		Testing Abteilung of the Transport Technical Examination Board	1st Co. Berlin, 2nd Co. Jüterbog

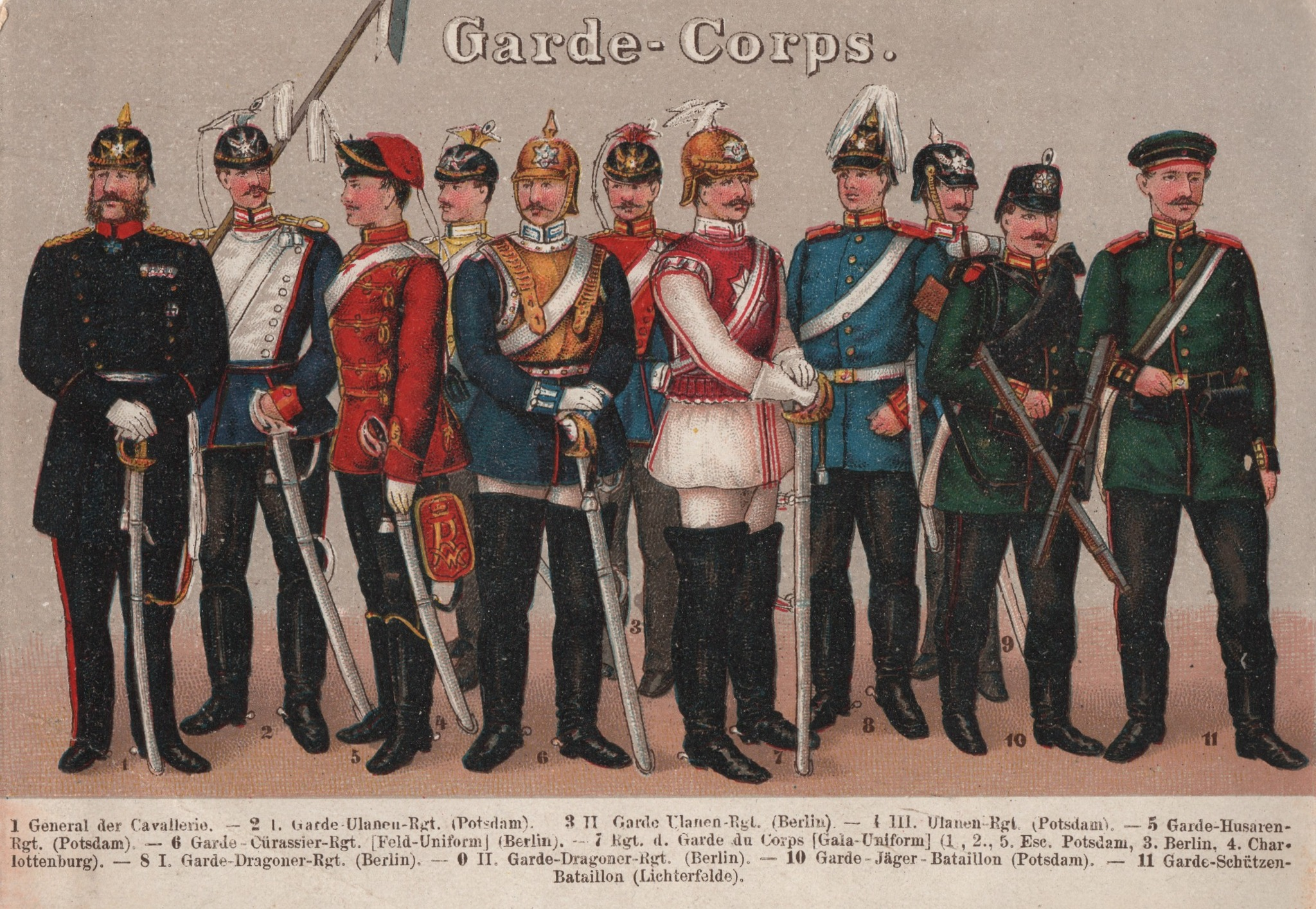
Uniforms of the Guards Corps' cavalry and Jäger units during La Belle Époque

== World War I ==
=== Organisation on mobilisation ===
On mobilization on 2 August 1914 the Corps was extensively restructured. The Guards Cavalry Division (less the 4th Guards Cavalry Brigade) was assigned to the I Cavalry Corps (Höhere Kavallerie-Kommando 1); the 4th Guards Cavalry Brigade was broken up and its regiments assigned to the divisions as reconnaissance units. The Lehr Infantry Battalion was expanded to form the Lehr Infantry Regiment. It formed 6th Guards Infantry Brigade (with the Guards Füsilier Regiment) and together with the 5th Guards Infantry Brigade formed the 3rd Guards Division of the Guards Reserve Corps. Divisions received engineer companies and other support units from the Corps headquarters.

In summary, the Guards Corps mobilised with 26 infantry battalions, 10 machine gun companies (60 machine guns), eight cavalry squadrons, 24 field artillery batteries (144 guns), four heavy artillery batteries (16 guns), three pioneer companies and an aviation detachment.

Initial wartime organization of the Corps
Corps	Division	Brigade	Units
Guards Corps	1st Guards Division	1st Guard Infantry Brigade	1st Foot Guards Regiment
Guards Corps	1st Guards Division	1st Guard Infantry Brigade	3rd Foot Guards Regiment
Guards Corps	1st Guards Division	1st Guard Infantry Brigade	Guards Jäger Battalion
Guards Corps	1st Guards Division	2nd Guard Infantry Brigade	2nd Foot Guards Regiment
Guards Corps	1st Guards Division	2nd Guard Infantry Brigade	4th Foot Guards Regiment
Guards Corps	1st Guards Division	1st Guard Field Artillery Brigade	1st Guards Field Artillery Regiment
Guards Corps	1st Guards Division	1st Guard Field Artillery Brigade	3rd Guards Field Artillery Regiment
Guards Corps	1st Guards Division		Leib Guards Hussar Regiment
Guards Corps	1st Guards Division		1st Company, Guards Pioneer Battalion
Guards Corps	1st Guards Division		1st Guards Divisional Pontoon Train
Guards Corps	1st Guards Division		1st Medical Company
Guards Corps	1st Guards Division		3rd Medical Company
Guards Corps	2nd Guards Division	3rd Guard Infantry Brigade	1st Guards Grenadier Regiment
Guards Corps	2nd Guards Division	3rd Guard Infantry Brigade	3rd Guards Grenadier Regiment
Guards Corps	2nd Guards Division	3rd Guard Infantry Brigade	Guards Schützen Battalion
Guards Corps	2nd Guards Division	4th Guard Infantry Brigade	2nd Guards Grenadier Regiment
Guards Corps	2nd Guards Division	4th Guard Infantry Brigade	4th Guards Grenadier Regiment
Guards Corps	2nd Guards Division	2nd Guard Field Artillery Brigade	2nd Guards Field Artillery Regiment
Guards Corps	2nd Guards Division	2nd Guard Field Artillery Brigade	4th Guards Field Artillery Regiment
Guards Corps	2nd Guards Division		2nd Guards Uhlan Regiment
Guards Corps	2nd Guards Division		2nd Company, Guards Pioneer Battalion
Guards Corps	2nd Guards Division		3rd Company, Guards Pioneer Battalion
Guards Corps	2nd Guards Division		2nd Guards Divisional Pontoon Train
Guards Corps	2nd Guards Division		2nd Medical Company
Guards Corps	Corps Troops		I Battalion, 1st Guards Foot Artillery Regiment
Guards Corps	Corps Troops		1st Aviation Detachment
Guards Corps	Corps Troops		Guards Corps Pontoon Train
Guards Corps	Corps Troops		Guards Telephone Detachment
Guards Corps	Corps Troops		Guards Pioneer Searchlight Section
Guards Corps	Corps Troops		Munition Trains and Columns corresponding to II Corps

=== Combat chronicle ===
On mobilisation, the Guards Corps was assigned to the 2nd Army as part of the right wing of the forces that invaded France and Belgium as part of the Schlieffen Plan offensive in August 1914.

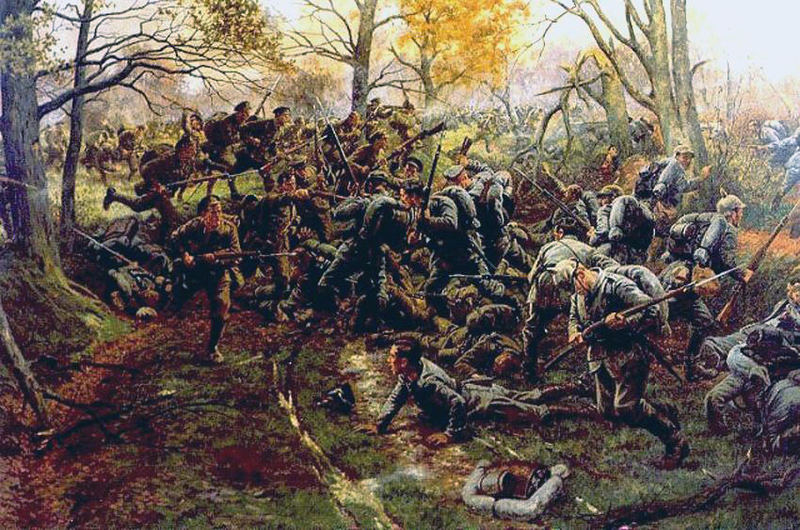
2nd Ox and Bucks defeating the Prussian Guard at Nonne Bosschen. Painting by William Barnes Wollen (1857–1936)

Soon into the war, at the First Battle of the Marne, the Prussian Guards were bitterly defeated in an attempt to take French positions.

In early July 1915 it participated in the "Battle of the Guards" near Krasnostav, acting against parts of the Russian Guard corps. It participated in the Battle of Lublin-Kholm in July 1915

In 1917, the corps was stationed on the Aisne River as part of 1st Army, and played an important role in the German defense against the French offensive in that sector.

It was still in existence at the end of the war in the 4th Army, Heeresgruppe Kronprinz Rupprecht, on the Western Front.

== Commanders ==
The Guards Corps had the following commanders during its existence:

From	Rank	Name
20 September 1814	General der Infanterie	Duke Charles of Mecklenburg
30 March 1838	Generalleutnant	Prince Wilhelm of Prussia
23 May 1848	Generalleutnant	Karl von Prittwitz
2 June 1853	General der Kavallerie	Karl von der Gröben
3 June 1858	General der Kavallerie	Prince August of Württemberg
30 August 1882	General der Kavallerie	Wilhelm von Brandenburg
21 August 1884	General der Infanterie	Alexander von Pape
19 September 1888	General der Infanterie	Oskar von Meerscheidt-Hüllessem
6 May 1893	General der Infanterie	Hugo von Winterfeld
18 August 1897	General der Infanterie	Max von Bock und Polach
27 January 1902	General der Infanterie	Gustav von Kessel
29 May 1909	General der Infanterie	Alfred von Loewenfeld
1 March 1913	General der Infanterie	Karl von Plettenberg
6 February 1917	General der Infanterie	Ferdinand von Quast
9 September 1917	General der Kavallerie	Graf zu Dohna-Schlobitten
2 November 1917	Generalleutnant	Alfred von Böckmann

== See also ==
- Franco-Prussian War order of battle
- German Army order of battle (1914)
- German Army order of battle, Western Front (1918)
- List of Imperial German infantry regiments
- List of Imperial German artillery regiments
- List of Imperial German cavalry regiments

== General bibliography ==
- Busche, Hartwig (1998). Formationsgeschichte der Deutschen Infanterie im Ersten Weltkrieg (1914 bis 1918) (in German). Institut für Preußische Historiographie.
- Cron, Hermann (2002) [1937]. Imperial German Army 1914–18: Organisation, Structure, Orders-of-Battle. Helion & Co. ISBN 1-874622-70-1.
- Ellis, John; Cox, Michael (1993). The World War I Databook. Aurum Press Ltd. ISBN 1-85410-766-6.
- Haythornthwaite, Philip J. (1996). The World War One Source Book. Arms and Armour. ISBN 1-85409-351-7.
- The German Forces in the Field; 7th Revision, 11th November 1918; Compiled by the General Staff, War Office. Imperial War Museum, London and the Battery Press. 1995 [1918]. ISBN 978-1-870423-95-3.
- Histories of Two Hundred and Fifty-One Divisions of the German Army Which Participated in the War (1914-1918). Document (United States. War Department) No. 905. Washington, D.C.: Government Printing Office. 1920. OCLC 1387464.
- Wegner, Günter (1993). Stellenbesetzung der deutschen Heere 1815–1939, Bd. 1. Biblio Verlag, Osnabrück.
