= Guards Corps =

Guards Corps or Guard Corps may refer to:

- Guards Corps (German Empire), a unit of the Prussian and Imperial German armies
- Guards Reserve Corps, a unit of the Imperial German Army
- Guard Corps (Haganah), a unit of the Zionist paramilitary organisation Haganah
- Islamic Revolutionary Guard Corps, a branch of the Iranian Armed Forces

See also

- Gardes du Corps (Prussia)
- Russian Guards
- Imperial Guard (Napoleon I)
- Imperial Guards (Qing Dynasty)
