= Guards Army =

Guards army may refer to:

- The Russian Guards (the Tsarist Russian Gvardiya and similar elite military units of modern Russia, Belarus, Ukraine, and the former Soviet Union.)
- A common translation for the Wuwei Corps (武衛軍) of the late Qing dynasty in China

== See also ==
- List of army units called Guards
