= Infanterie-Regiment Nr. 410 =

Military unit

Infanterie-Regiment Nr. 410 was a war-time formation in the German Imperial Army during the First World War. It was created late 1916 and was attached to the 405. Infanterie-Brigade of the 203. Infanterie-Division.

It fought in the October 1918 Battle of Blanc Mont Ridge. The unit was reformed on 9 October 1940 at Gross Born in Pomerania from parts of the 458th and 96th infantry regiments. From September 1941 to 1942 the regiment was commanded by Adolf Westhoff.

== See also ==
- List of Imperial German infantry regiments
