= Lehr Infantry Regiment =

Lehr Infantry Regiment Lehr-Infanterie-Regiment
- Active: 2 August 1914 - 1918
- Country: German Empire
- Branch: Infantry
- Type: Regiment
- Size: 3,489 on formation (Note: On mobilisation, a normal Infantry Regiment had a strength of 86 officers, medical officers and officials, and 3,304 NCOs and men. The Lehr Infantry Regiment had two machine gun companies so an extra 4 officers, 9 NCOs and 86 men.)
- Garrison/HQ: Potsdam
- Engagements: World War I Battle of the Frontiers Eastern Front: 1st Masurian Lakes, Łódź (1914), Gorlice-Tarnów Offensive Western Front: Somme, Battle of Delville Wood, Arras (1917), Passchendaele, Cambrai (1917), German spring offensive, Aisne-Marne, Meuse-Argonne Offensive

The Lehr (Note: Lehr (meaning teach, instruction or training) is usually left untranslated.) Infantry Regiment (German: Lehr-Infanterie-Regiment) was an infantry regiment of the Imperial German Army in World War I. It was formed on mobilisation of the German Army in August 1914 and served with the 3rd Guards Division through to the end of the war.

== Lehr Infantry Battalion ==
The Lehr Infantry Battalion (German: Infanterie-Lehr-Bataillon) - infantry instruction battalion - was raised in 1819 for the Prussian Army. In 1914 it was part of the Guards Corps and garrisoned in Potsdam.

== Lehr Infantry Regiment ==
=== Formation ===
With the mobilisation of the German Army on 2 August 1914, the Lehr Infantry Battalion was expanded to regimental strength as the Lehr Infantry Regiment. It was formed as follows:

Company	Origin
1st, 3rd, 6th, 11th	Lehr Infantry Battalion
5th, 7th, 8th	Infantry Shooting School (Note: German: Infanterie-Schießschule)
2nd, 4th, 9th, 10th	NCOs School, Potsdam (Note: German: Unteroffizierschule Potsdam); Weapons Testing Commission (Note: German: Gewehr-Prüfungskommission); Guards reservists
12th	Lehr Infantry Battalion; Infantry Shooting School; Weapons Testing Commission

The Regiment was also provided with two machine gun companies.

=== Combat chronicle ===
The Lehr Infantry Regiment joined the Guards Fusilier Regiment in the new 6th Guards Infantry Brigade as part of the 3rd Guards Division in the Guards Reserve Corps. It remained with the 3rd Guards Division throughout the war, even after the Division was triangularized in May 1915.

The Guards Reserve Corps was assigned to the 2nd Army as part of the right wing of the forces that invaded France and Belgium as part of the Schlieffen Plan offensive in August 1914. It participated in the capture of Namur and was immediately transferred to the Eastern Front to join the 8th Army in time to participate in the First Battle of the Masurian Lakes. It then fought in the Battle of Łódź. It continued fighting in the Carpathians and Galicia and then participated in the Gorlice-Tarnów Offensive.

The Regiment returned to the Western Front with its Division in April 1916 and entered the trenches in the Champagne region. In July 1916 it fought in the Battle of the Somme. At the beginning of September 1916, the division was again sent to the Eastern Front, returning in November. In 1917 it participated in the Battle of Arras and the Battle of Passchendaele. It then fought against the Allied tank attack in November 1917 in the Battle of Cambrai. In 1918, it fought in the German spring offensive. During the subsequent Allied offensives and counteroffensives, the division faced the French and Americans at Aisne-Marne and in the Meuse-Argonne Offensive. The division was rated as one of the best German divisions by Allied intelligence.

By the end of the war, the Regiment was still with the 3rd Guards Division, XXV Reserve Corps, 3rd Army, Heeresgruppe (Note: Heeresgruppe or Army Group in the sense of a number of armies under a single commander.) Deutscher Kronprinz on the Western Front.

Throughout the war, the Regiment lost 103 officers and 5,463 NCOs and men.

== See also ==
- List of Imperial German infantry regiments
- German Army order of battle (1914)
- German Army order of battle, Western Front (1918)

== Bibliography ==
- Busche, Hartwig (1998). Formationsgeschichte der Deutschen Infanterie im Ersten Weltkrieg (1914 bis 1918) (in German). Institut für Preußische Historiographie.
- Cron, Hermann (2002). Imperial German Army 1914-18: Organisation, Structure, Orders-of-Battle [first published: 1937]. Helion & Co. ISBN 1-874622-70-1.
- Ellis, John; Cox, Michael (1993). The World War I Databook. Aurum Press Ltd. ISBN 1-85410-766-6.
- The German Forces in the Field; 7th Revision, 11th November 1918; Compiled by the General Staff, War Office. Imperial War Museum, London and the Battery Press. 1995 [1918]. ISBN 978-1-870423-95-3.
- Histories of Two Hundred and Fifty-One Divisions of the German Army which Participated in the War (1914-1918), compiled from records of Intelligence section of the General Staff, American Expeditionary Forces, at General Headquarters, Chaumont, France 1919. The London Stamp Exchange Ltd. 1989 [1920]. ISBN 0-948130-87-3.
- Mülmann, Wilhelm von (1935). Geschichte des Lehr-Infanterie-Regiments und seiner Stammformationen. Zeulenroda: Sporn.
