= 93rd Reserve Infantry Regiment =

Military unit

The 93rd Reserve Infantry Regiment (German: Reserve-Infanterie-Regiment, Nr. 93) was unit in the Imperial German Army during the First World War. Established shortly after the outbreak of war in 1914, it was affiliated with the 4th Foot Guards in Berlin. Within weeks of its formation as part of 1st Guards Reserve Division, the unit was at full complement and departed for Belgium where it was soon actively engaged in combat operations. With the creation of the 4th Guards Infantry Division in May 1915, the regiment was attached to its 5th Guards Infantry Brigade. The unit lost over 3,000 soldiers and was disbanded when the war ended.

== See also ==
- List of Imperial German infantry regiments
