= Infanterie-Regiment Nr. 409 =

Military unit

Infanterie-Regiment Nr. 409 was a war-time formation in the German Imperial Army during the First World War. It was created on October 2, 1916 the redesignation of a pre-existing Ersatz unit called Abwehr-Regiment Hamburg, and the addition of two machine gun companies. The regiment was attached to the 405. Infanterie-Brigade of the 203. Infanterie-Division.

== Commanders ==
- Major Erwin Geiseler

== Chronology ==
Infanterie-Regiment Nr. 409 served on both the Eastern and Western Fronts. In mid-October 1916 was transported to the Baltic region where it saw combat in the vicinity of Riga. Following the end of the war with Russia, the regiment was transported in late December 1917 to France, where it remained for the rest of the war.

== Additional information ==
Although records are incomplete, the unit lost over 600 men killed during the war; at least 56 officers and 1913 Other Ranks were wounded.

== See also ==
- List of Imperial German infantry regiments

== Sources ==
- Geiseler, Erwin. Das Infanterie-Regiment Nr. 409. Zeulenroda (Thüringen): Bernhard Spohrn, 1928.
