= 2. Hannoversches Infanterie-Regiment Nr. 77 =

Military unit

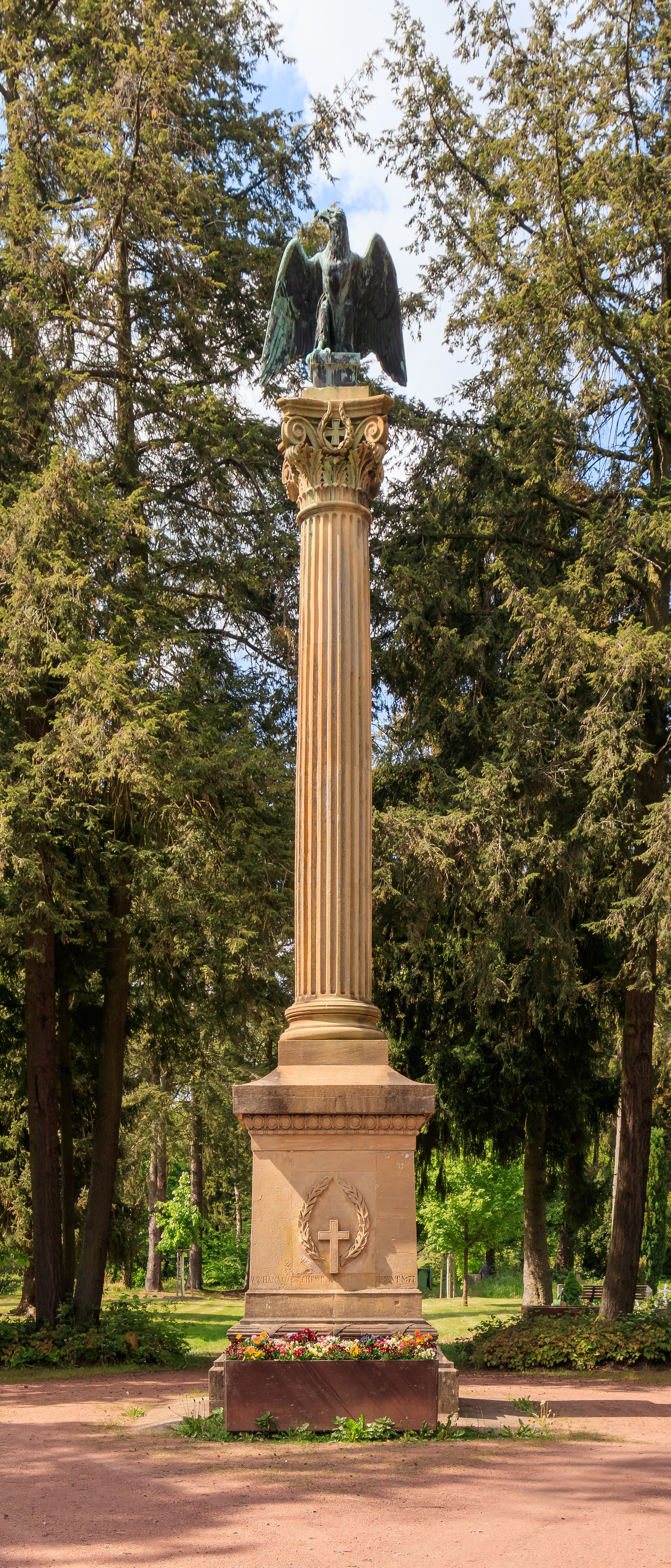
Memorial for the regiment's participation in the Battle of Spicheren, Forest Cemetery in Saarbrücken

The 2. Hannoversches Infanterie-Regiment Nr. 77 (77th [2nd Hanoverian] Infantry Regiment) was an infantry regiment in the Prussian Army (1867 to 1871) and Imperial German Army (1871 to 1918).

== Notable Members ==
- Georg von Kameke, General of the Infantry, Prussian Minister of War (Colonel-in-Chief)

== See also ==
- List of Imperial German infantry regiments
