= 19th (2nd Posen) Infantry Regiment "von Courbière" =

- Infanterie-Regiment „von Courbière“ (2. Posensches) Nr. 19
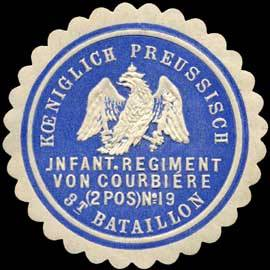
- The unit insignia of the 19th Infantry Regiment.
- Active: 1813–1919
- Country: Prussia
- Allegiance: Prussian Army
- Branch: Army
- Type: Infantry
- Decorations: War Commemorative Medal of 1866

The 19th (2nd Posen) Infantry Regiment "von Courbière" (German: Infanterie-Regiment „von Courbière“ (2. Posensches) Nr. 19), formerly known as the 7th Reserve Infantry Regiment (German: 7. Reserve-Infanterie-Regiment), was an infantry regiment of the Prussian Army.

== History ==
The regiment was formed at Neudorf on 1 July 1813 from the 3rd Musketeer Battalion and the 1st and 2nd Reserve Battalions of the 2nd West Prussian Infantry Regiment in Glatz. It was initially formed under the name 7. Reserve-Infanterie-Regiment, and was initially under the command of Major Arnold von Schutter. The unit took part in the German campaign of 1813 as part of the II Corps. particularly in the Battle of Lützen and the Battle of Bautzen in May, as well as at the Battle of Dresden in August, and the Battle of Leipzig in October. In 1814, the unit participated in the Battle of Paris. In 1815, the 3rd Battalion was renamed the Fusilier Battalion, and the regiment was renamed the 19th Infantry Regiment (4th West Prussian).

During the Waterloo campaign, the regiment had been part of the 4th Brigade of General Zieten's I Corps. At the Battle of Ligny, the 1st and 3rd Battalions of the 19th Infantry Regiment were charged with the defense of the village of Ligny, while the unit's 2nd Battalion was positioned on the slope between Ligny and the 2nd Brigade of the I Corps. The unit later took part at the Battle of Wavre.

On 10 March 1823, the unit was again renamed the 19th Infantry Regiment. The unit also took part in suppressing the Greater Poland Uprising. In 1859, much of the unit's officers and soldiers were transferred to the 59th Infantry Regiment. On 4 July 1860, the unit was once again renamed the 19th (2nd Posen) Infantry Regiment. In 1866, during the Austro-Prussian War, the regiment participated in multiple engagements against Bavarian forces as part of the Prussian Army of the Main, such as the Battle of Dermbach, the Battle of Kissingen, and the Battle of Aschaffenburg. The regiment was also decorated with a War Commemorative Medal of 1866 on 10 July 1866 for their actions at the Battle of Kissingen. During the Franco-Prussian War, the regiment was stationed outside Metz from 19 August until 27 October, and took part in the Battle of St. Quentin on 19 January 1871. On 27 January 1889, Kaiser Wilhelm II renamed the unit to the 19th (2nd Posen) Infantry Regiment "von Courbière", in honor of Field Marshal Wilhelm René de l’Homme de Courbière.

Following the Armistice of Compiègne, the regiment demobilized in March 1919.
