= 13th (1st Westphalian) Infantry Regiment "Herwarth von Bittenfeld" =

- Infanterie-Regiment „Herwarth von Bittenfeld“ (1. Westfälisches) Nr. 13
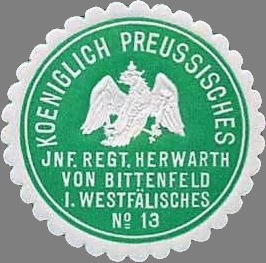
- Seal of the 13th Infantry Regiment
- Active: 1813–1919
- Country: Prussia
- Allegiance: Prussian Army
- Branch: Army
- Type: Reserve infantry (1813–1815); Line infantry
- Garrison/HQ: Königsberg (1813–1817), Münster (after 1817), Hamm (1866–1877), Paderborn (1887–1890)
- Nickname: Thirteeners
- Patron: Karl Eberhard Herwarth von Bittenfeld

The 13th (1st Westphalian) Infantry Regiment "Herwarth von Bittenfeld" (German: Infanterie-Regiment „Herwarth von Bittenfeld“ (1. Westfälisches) Nr. 13), formerly known as the 1st Reserve Infantry Regiment (German: 1. Reserve-Infanterie-Regiment) was an infantry regiment of the Prussian Army.

== History ==
=== Formation ===
On 1 July 1813, by a Cabinet Order issued by the Prussian Cabinet, twelve reserve infantry regiments were formed in the eastern provinces of Prussia not occupied by France. Accordingly, the 13th Infantry Regiment was formed initially as the 1st Reserve Infantry Regiment in Königsberg, and was assigned to the 1st East Prussian Infantry Regiment. The regiment was formed from the 1st, 2nd, and 3rd East Prussian Reserve Musketeer Battalions, as well as the 1st Lithuanian Reserve Musketeer Battalion, with garrisons in Königsberg and Graudenz. Normally, infantry regiments had three battalions, not four. However, when the reserve regiments had been formed, more soldiers had been raised than what could be distributed among the line infantry battalions, so a number of Prussian reserve regiments received an additional battalion.

The soldiers of the regiment's four battalions came from the Prussian provinces of East Prussia and West Prussia, as well as from parts of Memel, and received varied levels of training. Some received extensive levels of training during their active service, while others had only received brief training under the Krümper system. The battalions were reinforced with volunteer riflemen who formed a command reserve. The equipment and armaments of the regiment were inconsistent, and sometimes in poor condition. The 1st Battalion, which had formed earlier, received uniforms manufactured in Britain, while the other three battalions received uniforms from the regiments they used to belong to: blue coats with red collars and cuffs, white shoulder straps, and gray trousers. The majority of their armament were French muskets captured by the Russians during the French invasion of Russia.

=== Napoleonic Wars ===
The regiment participated in the War of the Sixth Coalition against France. The 1st Battalion participated in the Siege of Stettin in late March 1813. The 2nd, 3rd, and 4th Battalions participated in the Battle of Luckau on 4 June 1813, where they were part of the Prussian III Corps under the command of Friedrich Wilhelm von Bülow. The regiment was then attached to the Hirschfeld Division within the IV Army Corps, and fought in the Battle of Hagelberg. The regiment was in the reserve during the Battle of Großbeeren and the Battle of Dennewitz, and also participated in the Siege of Magdeburg in early 1814. Following the Napoleon's abdication in 1814, the regiment's 4th Battalion was disbanded on 25 April 1815, and the 3rd Battalion was made a fusilier battalion. When Napoleon returned from exile in 1815, the regiment re-mobilized, and saw action at the Siege of Landau on 7 July 1815.

By a Cabinet Order issued by the Prussian Cabinet on 25 March 1815, the 1st Reserve Infantry Regiment was renamed the 13th Line Infantry Regiment, and became a line infantry regiment. The regiment returned to its garrison in Königsberg in February 1816. The 2nd Battalion was initially quartered in Rastenburg and Rößel, but moved to Königsberg in July 1816.

In 1817, the regiment was transferred to Westphalia, the territories of which had been annexed by Prussia following the Congress of Vienna in 1815. The regimental staff and 1st Battalion were quartered in Münster, while the other two battalions were quartered in Soest and Wesel. Initially, there had been mistrust between the Prussian troops and the local population of Westphalia, the latter of whom was also predominantly Catholic. However, this changed by the end of the 19th century, partially due to the conscription of Westphalian, mostly Catholic conscripts.

=== Second Schleswig War ===
During the Second Schleswig War of 1864, the regiment participated as part of the 13th Division, and was involved in the Battle of Mysunde on 2 February, as well as in the Battle of Dybbøl in April, and at the Battle of Als on 29 June. The regiment suffered losses of around 15 killed or wounded during the Second Schleswig War, including one officer. Additionally, 32 soldiers also died from disease, such as fever and typhus.

=== Austro-Prussian War ===
In 1866, the regiment participated in the Austro-Prussian War again as part of the 13th Division in the Army of the Main. The unit took part in the Battle of Dermbach on 2 and 3 July, at the Battle of Kissingen on 10 July, at the Battle of Frohnhofen on 13 July, at the Battle of Aschaffenburg on 14 July, at the Battle of Battle of Tauberbischofsheim on 24 July, and at the Battle of Gerchsheim on 25 July. The regiment suffered 56 casualties during the Austro-Prussian War, including seven officers. 25 soldiers of the regiment were killed or died of wounds at Dermbach, while 26 were killed or died later of wounds at Aschaffenburg. Additionally, 21 soldiers died from disease, mostly from typhus or cholera.

=== Franco-Prussian War ===
The regiment participated in the Franco-Prussian War once again as part of the 13th Division, now under the VII Corps. It participated in the Battle of Borny-Colombey on 14 August, at the Battle of Gravelotte on 18 August, as well as at the Siege of Metz. 107 men of the regiment were killed during the war, including seven officers. Most losses occurred at the Battle of Borny-Colombey. In addition, 123 soldiers died from disease, and two were reported missing. In total, 232 men died, and several hundred were wounded.

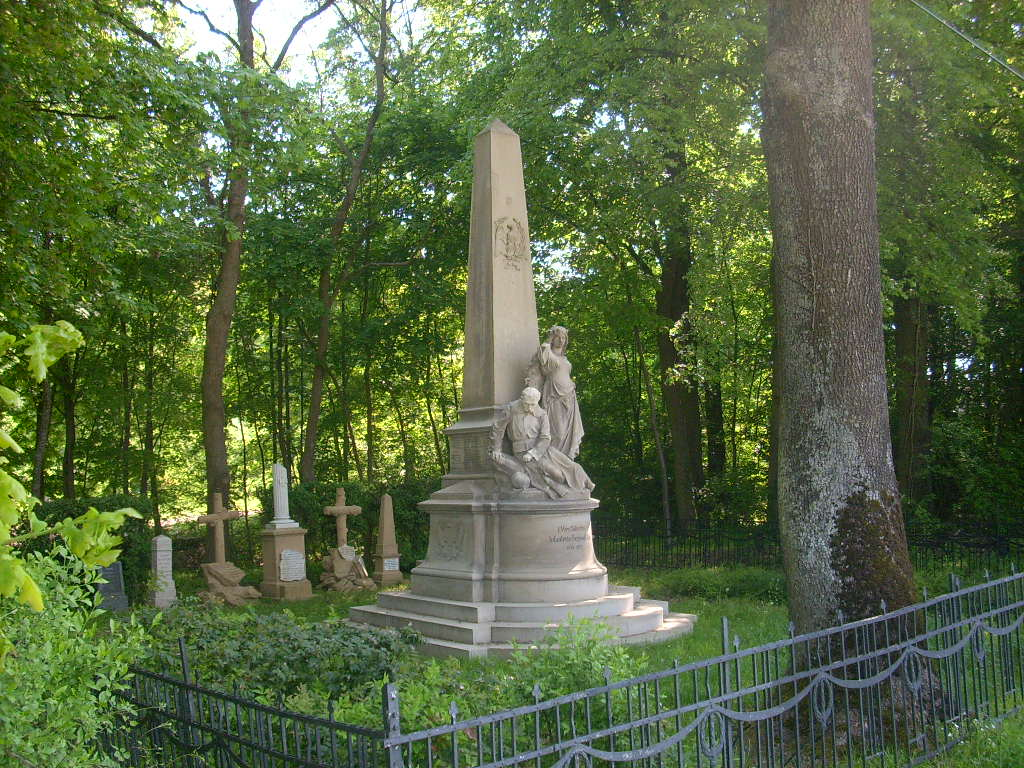
A memorial of the regiment at Colombey.

In 1872, a memorial to the fallen of the regiment was erected in the Ludgeriplatz in Münster. The memorial, named "Mourning Germania", had a two-meter-high statue of Germania, which was depicted with a sword and shield, and standing on a pedestal. The names of the fallen soldiers of the regiment were written on the pedestal. The memorial was later moved to Neubrückentor, and was destroyed during the Second World War.

The 13th Infantry Regiment became well-known in Westphalia. Its soldiers were nicknamed "Thirteeners", and became popular in Münster. In 1881, the regiment transferred its 7th Company to the 131st Infantry Regiment, stationed in Lorraine. In 1887, a 4th Battalion was formed, consisting of the regiment's 3rd Company, the 2nd Company of the 53rd (5th Westphalian) Infantry Regiment, and the 11th Company of the 15th (2nd Westphalian) Infantry Regiment. In 1889, Prussian general Eberhard Herwarth von Bittenfeld was posthumously honored as the regiment's namesake. In 1890, the 4th Battalion was later transferred to the newly-formed 140th Infantry Regiment stationed in West Prussia. In 1893, a half-battalion was formed within the regiment, and was later transferred in 1897 to the 158th Infantry Regiment stationed in Lorraine.

=== First World War ===
With the outbreak of the First World War, the regiment mobilized in 1914, and was once again attached to the 13th Division. The regiment saw action exclusively on the Western Front in Belgium and France. The regiment participated in the Battle of the Frontiers in 1914, and later at the Battle of St. Quentin, in actions at Reims and Lille, as well as at the Battle of Verdun. The regiment lost a particularly large amount of troops at Verdun. Following the Armistice of Compiègne, the survivors of the regiment travelled home on foot and by train. On 8 December 1918, the regiment's survivors entered Münster. The regiment later demobilized on 30 September 1919.

== Commanders ==
The regiment's first commander was Karl Ferdinand von Langen, who served from 1813 until 1815. The honorary title of Regimental Chief was held by Ernst von Pfuel from 1842 until 1849, and was later held by Grand Duke Augustus of Oldenburg from 1851 until 1853. Eberhard Herwarth von Bittenfeld, the regiment's namesake, also held the honorary title from 1861 until 1884, and was followed by Duke William of Württemburg, who was followed by Wilhelm von Blume from 1897 until 1910. The regiment's last commander was Hermann Delius, who served as the regimental commander after 1914.

== Garrisons and barracks ==
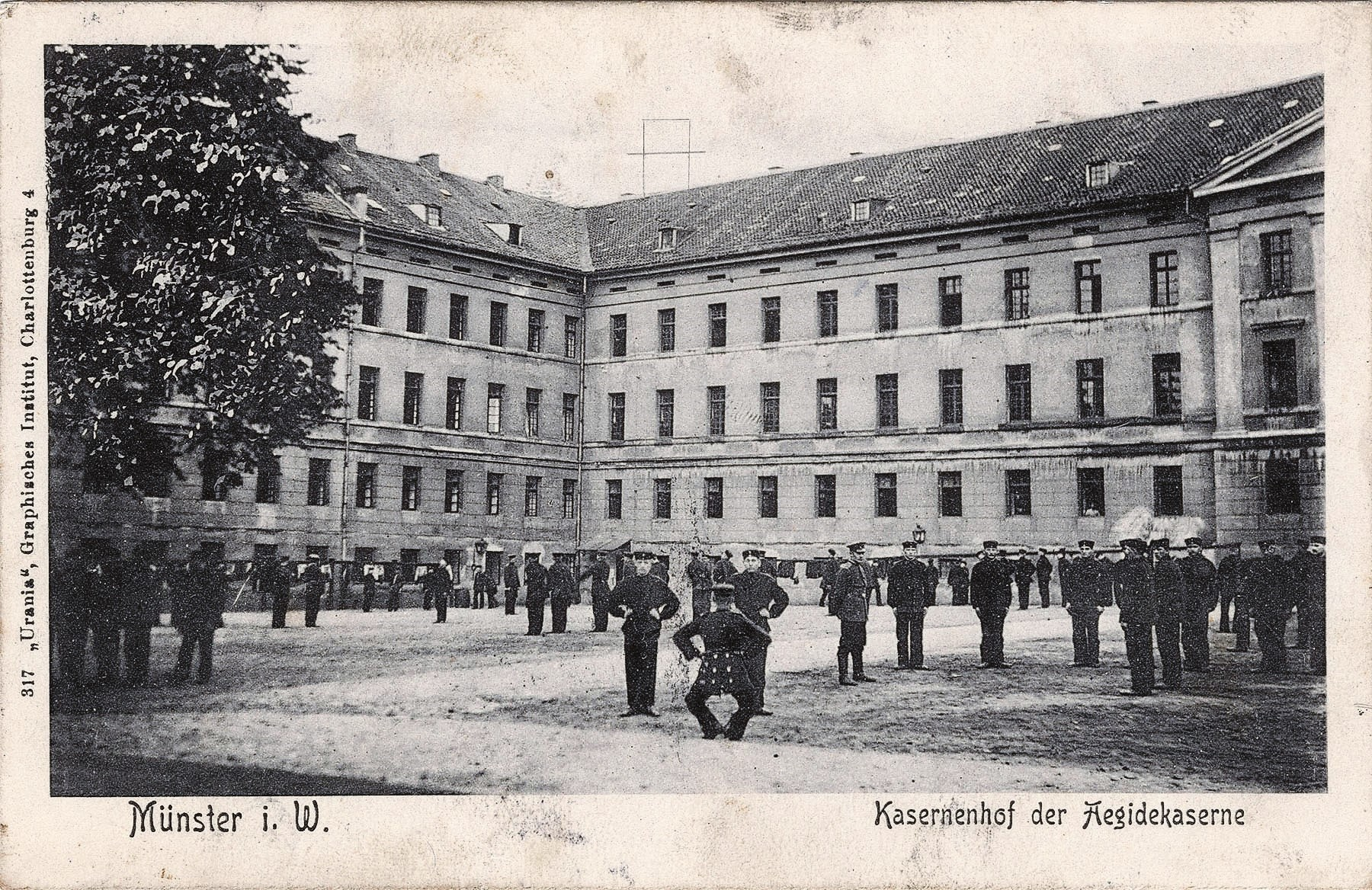
The Aegidii Barracks in Münster.

Münster was the regiment's main garrison for most of its existence. After the regiment's relocation from Königsberg in 1817, the members of the staff as well as the 1st and 2nd Battalions were billeted in private homes. However, this became increasingly difficult with the growing amount of soldiers. Furthermore, the constant billeting was unpopular with the local population of Münster. In the autumn of 1820, the 1st and 2nd Companies of the regiment were transferred to and quartered in a converted Minorite monastery in Münster. An officer's mess had also been established there. The Minorite barracks on Neubrückenstraße was located near the Church of Apostles in Münster, which later became a military church following renovations. The other six companies remained billeted in private homes. In 1831, the six companies which have not been quartered moved to the recently-constructed Aegidii Barracks. The Aegidii Barracks was a three-story building that consisted of two wings. The northern wing ran along the modern-day Johannisstraße/Bispinghof, while the eastern wing ran along Aegidiistraße. The courtyard between the two wings served as a parade ground. The regiment used the Aegidii Barracks until its disbandment in 1919. Afterwards, the barracks was used to house a police school and a main supply office for the Reichswehr. The barracks were demolished following the Second World War, and was replaced by a new building with underground parking and a garage.
