= 24th (4th Brandenburg) Infantry Regiment "Grand Duke Frederick Francis II of Mecklenburg Schwerin" =

- Infanterie-Regiment „Großherzog Friedrich Franz II. von Mecklenburg-Schwerin“ (4. Brandenburgisches) Nr. 24
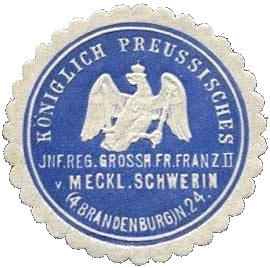
- Seal stamp of the 24th Infantry Regiment, which displays the unit insignia of the regiment.
- Active: 1813–1919
- Country: Prussia
- Allegiance: Prussian Army
- Branch: Army
- Type: Infantry
- Patron: Frederick Francis II

The 24th (4th Brandenburg) Infantry Regiment "Grand Duke Frederick Francis II of Mecklenburg-Schwerin" (German: Infanterie-Regiment „Großherzog Friedrich Franz II. von Mecklenburg-Schwerin“ (4. Brandenburgisches) Nr. 24) was an infantry regiment of the Prussian Army.

== History ==
=== Napoleonic Wars ===
On 1 July 1813, twelve reserve infantry regiments were formed in the eastern provinces of Prussia. Accordingly, the 24th Infantry Regiment was initially formed as the 12th Reserve Infantry Regiment. During the War of the Sixth Coalition, the reserve battalions took part in the Battle of Luckau in 1813. The regiment later took part in the Battle of Möckern in early April, and later in the Battle of the Katzbach in late August. On 30 March 1814, the unit took part in the Battle of Paris.

During the Hundred Days, the unit took part in the Battle of Ligny on 16 June 1815, and then at the Battle of Waterloo two days later. In November, the unit returned to its garrison in Breslau. The unit was then assigned to the Silesian General Command.

In 1817, the unit was reassigned to the III (Brandenburg) Army Corps, and transferred to Frankfurt (Oder). It remained there for three years unit it was transferred to Rupppin and Prenzlau in 1820.

=== German Revolution of 1848–49 ===
In May 1849, the unit took part in suppressing an uprising in Dresden. On the night of 7 May, the unit's fusilier battalion moved from Berlin to Dresden-Neustadt. On 11 May, the fusilier battalion left Dresden-Neustadt and met up with the rest of the unit to move to Westphalia. In total, during the uprising, Saxon and Prussian troops suffered 31 dead and 94 wounded. The regiment's fusilier battalion suffered 6 dead and 13 wounded.

Later, the 1st and 2nd Battalions were attached to the 2nd Division, while the fusilier battalion was attached to the 4th Division. Both divisions were part of the I Army Corps under the command of General Moritz von Hirschfeld, which occupied Baden and the Palatinate from the north and west between 11 and 18 June 1849. The fusilier battalion took part in the Battle of Kirchheimbolanden on 14 June 1849. Later, the battalions of the regiment participated in further minor engagements at Wiesental on 21 June, Neudorf on 24 June, Durlach on 25 June, Michelbach on 28 June, Nauenthal on 29 June, and between Kuppenheim and Muggensturm as well as a pursuit engagement near Iffezheim on 30 June.

=== Second Schleswig War ===
The regiment participated in the Second Schleswig War as part of the 6th Infantry Division. The fusilier battalion engaged in combat with Danish forces the Battle of Mysunde, commanded by the regimental commander, Colonel Emil von Hacke. The fusilier battalion suffered 5 killed and 8 wounded at Mysunde. The regiment was then assigned to the 12th Infantry Brigade. The unit then took part in the Battle of Dybbøl, where it took part in the siege of the fortifications around Dybbøl.

In July 1864, the war ended, with the unit having suffered 54 killed or missing, in addition to a total of 170 wounded or sick.

=== Austro-Prussian War ===
During the Austro-Prussian War, the regiment was attached to the 6th Infantry Division of the I Army, and participated in the Battle of Königgrätz as a reserve unit. As the regiment had been part of the reserves, it suffered relatively low losses, with one killed and seven wounded, all of which are at Königgrätz.

=== Franco-Prussian War ===
The unit participated in the Franco-Prussian War, again as part of the 6th Infantry Division, now part of the III Army Corps. The regiment suffered heavy losses at the Battle of Mars-la-Tour on 16 August 1870, alongside the 64th Infantry Regiment. The 24th Infantry Regiment and the 64th Infantry Regiment both joined to form the 12th Infantry Brigade. At Mars-la-Tour, the unit suffered 268 killed, 142 missing, and 181 seriously wounded. In January 1871, the unit fought in the Battle of Le Mans.

=== First World War ===
The regiment was mobilized in 1914 with the outbreak of the First World War, and fought ounce again as part of the 6th Infantry Division, mostly on the Western Front. On the Eastern Front, the unit participated in the Serbian campaign in 1915, as well as in the Tarnopol offensive in 1917. On the Western Front, the unit took part in the Battle of Verdun, where it participated in the capture of Fort Douaumont.

After the Armistice of Compiègne, the regiment marched back to its garrison in Neuruppin, where it demobilized on 21 December 1918. Two Freikorps units were formed from its detachments in December 1918 and January 1919.
