= Guards Reserve Corps =

Guards Reserve Corps Garde-Reserve-Korps
- Flag of the Staff of a Generalkommando (1871–1918)
- Active: 2 August 1914 – 9 February 1915; 7 July 1915 – post November 1918
- Country: German Empire
- Type: Corps
- Size: c. 38,000 (on formation)
- Engagements: World War I Battle of the Frontiers Eastern Front First Battle of the Masurian Lakes Battle of the Vistula River Western Front Battle of Passchendaele Battle of Pilckem Ridge

Insignia
- Abbreviation: Garde RK

The Guards Reserve Corps (German: Garde-Reserve-Korps / Garde RK) was a corps level command of the German Army in World War I.

== Formation ==
Guards Reserve Corps was formed on the outbreak of the war in August 1914 as part of the mobilisation of the Prussian Army. It was initially commanded by General der Artillerie Max von Gallwitz, formerly Inspector General of Artillery. It was dissolved on 9 February 1915 as its headquarters was used to form the headquarters of Armee-Gruppe Gallwitz (later 12th Army) on the Eastern Front.

Temporary Corps Marschall was formed on 7 July 1915 and renamed Guards Reserve Corps on 18 April 1916. It was still in existence at the end of the war in the 4th Army, part of Heeresgruppe Kronprinz Rupprecht on the Western Front.

=== Structure on formation ===
On formation in August 1914, Guards Reserve Corps consisted of two divisions. In general, reserve corps and reserve divisions were weaker than their active counterparts, but the Guards Reserve Corps was exceptional in that

the 3rd Guards Division, although new, consisted almost entirely of regular army units
the 1st Guards Reserve Division had a field artillery brigade of two regiments (most reserve divisions only had one regiment)
the corps troops were equivalent to an active corps, lacking only an aviation detachment

The Guards Reserve Corps mobilised with 26 infantry battalions, 9 machine gun companies (54 machine guns), 6 cavalry squadrons, 24 field artillery batteries (144 guns), 4 heavy batteries (16 guns) and 3 pioneer companies.

Corps	Division	Brigade	Units
Guards Reserve Corps	3rd Guards Division	5th Guards Infantry Brigade	5th Foot Guards Regiment
Guards Reserve Corps	3rd Guards Division	5th Guards Infantry Brigade	5th Guards Grenadiers Regiment
Guards Reserve Corps	3rd Guards Division	6th Guards Infantry Brigade	Guard Fusilier Regiment
Guards Reserve Corps	3rd Guards Division	6th Guards Infantry Brigade	Lehr Infantry Regiment
Guards Reserve Corps	3rd Guards Division	3rd Guard Field Artillery Brigade	5th Guard Field Artillery Regiment
Guards Reserve Corps	3rd Guards Division	3rd Guard Field Artillery Brigade	6th Guard Field Artillery Regiment
Guards Reserve Corps	3rd Guards Division		Guards Reserve Uhlan Regiment
Guards Reserve Corps	3rd Guards Division		1st Company, 28th Pioneer Battalion
Guards Reserve Corps	3rd Guards Division		3rd Guards Divisional Pontoon Train
Guards Reserve Corps	3rd Guards Division		1st Guards Medical Company
Guards Reserve Corps	3rd Guards Division		3rd Guards Medical Company
Guards Reserve Corps	1st Guards Reserve Division	1st Guards Reserve Brigade	1st Guards Reserve Infantry Regiment
Guards Reserve Corps	1st Guards Reserve Division	1st Guards Reserve Brigade	2nd Guards Reserve Infantry Regiment
Guards Reserve Corps	1st Guards Reserve Division	1st Guards Reserve Brigade	Guards Reserve Jäger Battalion
Guards Reserve Corps	1st Guards Reserve Division	15th Reserve Infantry Brigade	64th Reserve Infantry Regiment
Guards Reserve Corps	1st Guards Reserve Division	15th Reserve Infantry Brigade	93rd Reserve Infantry Regiment
Guards Reserve Corps	1st Guards Reserve Division	15th Reserve Infantry Brigade	Guards Reserve Schützen Battalion
Guards Reserve Corps	1st Guards Reserve Division	Guards Reserve Field Artillery Brigade	1st Guards Reserve Field Artillery Regiment
Guards Reserve Corps	1st Guards Reserve Division	Guards Reserve Field Artillery Brigade	3rd Guards Reserve Field Artillery Regiment
Guards Reserve Corps	1st Guards Reserve Division		Guards Reserve Dragoon Regiment
Guards Reserve Corps	1st Guards Reserve Division		2nd Company, 28th Pioneer Battalion
Guards Reserve Corps	1st Guards Reserve Division		3rd Company, 28th Pioneer Battalion
Guards Reserve Corps	1st Guards Reserve Division		2nd Guards Divisional Pontoon Train
Guards Reserve Corps	1st Guards Reserve Division		2nd Guards Reserve Medical Company
Guards Reserve Corps	Corps Troops		II Battalion, 1st Guards Foot Artillery Regiment
Guards Reserve Corps	Corps Troops		Guards Reserve Corps Pontoon Train
Guards Reserve Corps	Corps Troops		Guards Reserve Telephone Detachment
Guards Reserve Corps	Corps Troops		28th Pioneer Searchlight Section
Guards Reserve Corps	Corps Troops		Munition Trains and Columns corresponding to the II Corps

== Combat chronicle ==
On mobilisation, Guards Reserve Corps was assigned to the 2nd Army as part of the right wing of the forces that invaded France and Belgium as part of the Schlieffen Plan offensive in August 1914. It participated in the capture of Namur and was immediately transferred to the Eastern Front to join the 8th Army in time to participate in the First Battle of the Masurian Lakes.

On 9 February 1915, the Corps headquarters was upgraded to form the headquarters of Armee-Gruppe Gallwitz (later the 12th Army).

Temporary Corps Marschall was formed on 7 July 1915 and established as the Guards Reserve Corps on 18 April 1916. It was still in existence at the end of the war in the 4th Army, Heeresgruppe Kronprinz Rupprecht on the Western Front.

== Commanders ==
Guards Reserve Corps had the following commanders during its existence:

From	Rank	Name	Notes
2 August 1914	General der Artillerie	Max von Gallwitz	
9 February 1915			Upgraded to Armee-Gruppe Gallwitz
14 February 1915			Reformed as Korps Marschall
17 April 1916	General der Kavallerie	Wolf Freiherr Marschall von Altengottern	

== Glossary ==
- Armee-Abteilung or Army Detachment in the sense of "something detached from an Army". It is not under the command of an Army so is in itself a small Army.
- Armee-Gruppe or Army Group in the sense of a group within an Army and under its command, generally formed as a temporary measure for a specific task.
- Heeresgruppe or Army Group in the sense of a number of armies under a single commander.

== See also ==
- German Army order of battle (1914)
- German Army order of battle, Western Front (1918)

== Bibliography ==
- Cron, Hermann (2002). Imperial German Army 1914-18: Organisation, Structure, Orders-of-Battle [first published: 1937]. Helion & Co. ISBN 1-874622-70-1.
- Busche, Hartwig (1998). Formationsgeschichte der Deutschen Infanterie im Ersten Weltkrieg (1914 bis 1918) (in German). Institut für Preußische Historiographie.
- Ellis, John; Cox, Michael (1993). The World War I Databook. Aurum Press Ltd. ISBN 1-85410-766-6.
- Histories of Two Hundred and Fifty-One Divisions of the German Army which Participated in the War (1914-1918), compiled from records of Intelligence section of the General Staff, American Expeditionary Forces, at General Headquarters, Chaumont, France 1919. The London Stamp Exchange Ltd. 1989 [1920]. ISBN 0-948130-87-3.
- The German Forces in the Field; 7th Revision, 11th November 1918; Compiled by the General Staff, War Office. Imperial War Museum, London and the Battery Press. 1995 [1918]. ISBN 978-1-870423-95-3.
