= 3rd Guards Infantry Division (German Empire) =

3rd Guards Infantry Division (3. Garde-Infanterie-Division)
- Active: 1914-1919
- Country: Prussia/Germany
- Branch: Army
- Type: Infantry
- Size: Approx. 15,000
- Engagements: World War I: 1st Masurian Lakes, Łódź (1914), Gorlice-Tarnów Offensive, Somme, Battle of Delville Wood, Arras (1917), Passchendaele, Cambrai (1917), German spring offensive, Aisne-Marne, Meuse-Argonne Offensive

Commanders
- Notable commanders: Karl Litzmann (1914)

The 3rd Guards Infantry Division (3. Garde-Infanterie-Division) was a unit of the German Army, in World War I. The division was formed on the mobilization of the German Army in August 1914 as part of the Guards Reserve Corps. The division was disbanded in 1919, during the demobilization of the German Army after World War I. It was a division of the Prussian Guards and was thus raised and recruited throughout the Kingdom of Prussia from the elite of recruits.

== Combat chronicle ==
The 3rd Guards Infantry Division began the war on the Western Front, participating in the capture of Namur. It was transferred to the Eastern Front in September 1914, and saw action on arrival in the First Battle of the Masurian Lakes. It then fought in the Battle of Łódź. It continued fighting in the Carpathians and Galicia and then participated in the Gorlice-Tarnów Offensive. The division returned to the Western Front in April 1916 and entered the trenches in the Champagne region. In July 1916, it fought in the Battle of the Somme. At the beginning of September 1916, the division was again sent to the Eastern Front, returning in November. In 1917, it participated in the Battle of Arras and the Battle of Passchendaele. It then fought against the Allied tank attack in November 1917 in the Battle of Cambrai. In 1918, it fought in the German spring offensive. During the subsequent Allied offensives and counteroffensives, the division faced the French and Americans at Aisne-Marne and in the Meuse-Argonne Offensive. The division was rated as one of the best German divisions by Allied intelligence.

== Order of battle on mobilization ==
The order of battle of the 3rd Guards Infantry Division on mobilization was as follows:

- 5th Guards Infantry Brigade
  - 5th Guard Regiment of Foot
  - 5th Guard Grenadier Regiment
- 6th Guards Infantry Brigade
  - Guard Fusilier Regiment
  - Lehr Infantry Regiment
- 3rd Guard Field Artillery Brigade (German Empire)|3rd Guard Field Artillery Brigade
  - 5th Guard Field Artillery Regiment
  - 6th Guard Field Artillery Regiment
- Guards Reserve Uhlan Regiment
- 1st Company/28th (2nd Brandenburg) Pioneer-Battalion

== Order of battle on July 1, 1916 ==
The 3rd Guards Infantry Division was triangularized in May 1915. The order of battle on July 1, 1916, was as follows:

- 6th Guards Infantry Brigade
  - Guard Fusilier Regiment
  - Lehr Infantry Regiment
  - 9th Colberg (Graf Gneisenau) (2nd Pomeranian) Grenadier Regiment
- Guards Reserve Uhlan Regiment
- 5th Guard Field Artillery Regiment
- II Battalion/6th Reserve Foot Artillery
- 1st Company/28th (2nd Brandenburg) Pioneer-Battalion
- Pioneer-Company No. 274
- Guards Minenwerfer Company No. 3

== Order of battle on March 20, 1918 ==
The 3rd Guards Infantry Division's order of battle on March 20, 1918, was as follows:

- 6th Guards Infantry Brigade
  - Guard Fusilier Regiment
  - Lehr Infantry Regiment
  - 9th Colberg (Graf Gneisenau) (2nd Pomeranian) Grenadier Regiment
  - Maschinengewehr-Scharfschützen-Abteilung Nr. 2
- 1.Eskadron/2.Garde-Dragoner-Regiment Kaiserin Alexandra von Rußland
- 3rd Guard Artillery Command
  - 5th Guard Field Artillery Regiment
  - 1st Battalion, 2nd Guard Foot Artillery Regiment
- Staff, 104th Pioneer Battalion
  - 1st Company, 28th (2nd Brandenburg) Pioneer Battalion
  - 274th Pioneer Company
  - 3rd Guard Minenwerfer Company
- 3rd Guards Division Signal command
