= 3rd Foot Guards (German Empire) =

Infantry regiment of the Royal Prussian Army

The 3rd Foot Guards were an infantry regiment of the Royal Prussian Army. The regiment was formed in 1860. As part of the Guards Corps it fought in the Second Schleswig War, the Austro-Prussian War, the Franco-Prussian War and World War I. The regiment was disbanded in 1919 with the Infantry Regiment 9 Potsdam bearing its tradition.

== See also ==
- List of Imperial German infantry regiments
