= 5th (4th East Prussian) Grenadiers "King Frederick I" =

- Grenadier-Regiment „König Friedrich I.“ (4. Ostpreußisches) Nr. 5
- Active: 1808–1919
- Country: Prussia
- Allegiance: Prussian Army
- Branch: Army
- Type: Infantry
- Garrison/HQ: Danzig

Commanders
- Notable commanders: Col. Freiherr von Eichendorff (c. 1914)

The 5th (4th East Prussian) Grenadier Regiment "King Frederick I" (German: Grenadier-Regiment „König Friedrich I.“ (4. Ostpreußisches) Nr. 5), formerly known as the 4th East Prussian Infantry Regiment (German: 4. Ost-Preußisches Infanterie-Regiment) was an infantry unit of the Prussian Army.

== History ==
In 1808, the regiment was formed from several infantry regiments of the Old Prussian Army during its reorganization into the New Prussian Army. The unit was initially formed as the 4th East Prussian Infantry Regiment, chiefly from several Old Prussian regiments, including the 3rd Battalion of the No. 4 Infantry Regiment Von Kalkreuth.

In 1812, during the French invasion of Russia, the regiment's 1st and Fusilier Battalions were assigned to the 2nd East Prussian Combined Regiment within General Yorck's auxiliary corps, although their involvement in terms of combat was limited. After the Convention of Tauroggen, General Yorck's corps was initially exempt from any military action against the French or Russians. On 5 January 1813, the Fusilier and 1st Battalions of the regiment arrived in Tilsit, and would replenish in Tilsit and Elbing, before crossing the Oder into Brandenburg in March.

At the end of March, Colonel August von Thümen received three musketeer battalions from the regiment to besiege the French forces at Spandau. These three musketeer battalions participated in the blockade of Spandau, as well as during multiple engagements in the assault on the French forces at Spandau during the closing stages of the siege. The regiment's 3rd Battalion formed Spandau's new garrison following the capitulation of the French forces at Spandau, while the 2nd Battalion escorted the French prisoners of war.

Then, as part of the 4th Division within the Prussian III Corps, the regiment participated in the Battle of Großbeeren, the Battle of Dennewitz, and the Battle of Leipzig. In 1814, the regiment was transferred to the 4th Brigade of the III Corps, and participated in the Battle of Laon as well as in skirmishes near Soissons. The regiment did not participate in the Hundred Days. Some time following the Napoleonic Wars, the regiment was renamed the 5th (4th East Prussian) Infantry Regiment, and the regiment was renamed once again to the 5th (4th East Prussian) Grenadier Regiment "King Frederick I" in 1889.

=== German Wars of Unification ===
During the Austro-Prussian War, the regiment was involved in the Battle of Tratenau as well as in the Battle of Königgrätz. During the Franco-Prussian War, the regiment was involved in the Battle of Borny-Colombey as well as during the Siege of Metz and the Battle of Noisseville.

=== First World War ===
Upon the outbreak of the First World War, the regiment mobilized on 2 August 1914. Additionally, it also formed a four-company replacement battalion two recruit depots. Initially, the regiment saw action on the Eastern Front as part of the 71st Infantry Brigade, which was attached to the 36th Infantry Division. The regiment initially participated in the Battle of Tannenberg and the First Battle of the Masurian Lakes, before being transferred to the Western Front in September 1915.

In the Western Front, the regiment participated in the Battle of the Somme as well as in the Battle of Arras. Following the German spring offensive in 1918, the regiment would be involved in defensive operations until the end of the war. In September 1918, the regiment received its own trench mortar company. After the war, the regiment marched back to Danzig, and began demobilization in December 1918.
