= 18th (1st Posen) Infantry Regiment "von Grolman" =

- Infanterie-Regiment „von Grolman“ (1. Posensches) Nr. 18
- Active: 1813–1919
- Country: Prussia
- Allegiance: Prussian Army
- Branch: Army
- Type: Reserve infantry (1813–1815); Infantry
- Patron: Karl von Grolman

Commanders
- Notable commanders: Colonel Ernst von Löbell (first); Major Karl Wilsdorff (last)

The 18th (1st Posen Infantry Regiment) "von Grolman" (German: Infanterie-Regiment „von Grolman“ (1. Posensches) Nr. 18), formerly known as the 6th Reserve Infantry Regiment (German: 6. Reserve-Infanterie-Regiment) was an infantry regiment of the Prussian Army formed during the Napoleonic Wars.

== History ==
By a Prussian Cabinet Order on 1 July 1813, twelve reserve infantry regiments were to be formed in the eastern provinces of Prussia. Accordingly, the regiment was formed as the 6th Reserve Infantry Regiment from the 1st and 2nd Battalions of the 6th Infantry Regiment and the 4th Reserve Battalion of the 1st Silesian Infantry Regiment No. 11. Coincidentally, all three battalions had already been garrisoned together for some time, so when the regiment was formed, there was not much division of interests between the commanders of the battalions, and any that remained were hardly noticeable.

During the War of the Sixth Coalition, the unit took part in the Battle of Dresden as well as at the Battle of Kulm and the Battle of Leipzig. At Leipzig, the regiment was positioned in Wachau and lost a large portion of its men, including 713 soldiers, 28 officers, 63 non-commissioned officers, and 10 musicians. In 1814, the regiment participated in engagements at La Ferté-sous-Jouarre and Beauville, as well as at the Battle of Paris. In March 1815, the regiment was renamed the 18th Infantry Regiment.

During the Waterloo campaign of the Hundred Days, the regiment was assigned to the 15th Brigade of the IV Army Corps, and took part in the Battle of Waterloo. During the battle, the regiment engaged against the Young Guard and the Old Guard for four hours in a churchyard in Plancenoit. The regiment suffered particularly heavy casualties at Waterloo, including 740 soldiers, 21 officers, 49 non-commissioned officers, and 5 musicians. Of whom, 6 non-commissioned officers and 124 soldiers were lost on the field.

During the Second Schleswig War, the regiment took part in storming the Dybbøl fortifications during the Battle of Dybbøl, losing eleven officers and 131 soldiers in the process. During the Austro-Prussian War, the regiment took part in the Battle of Gitschin as well as in the Battle of Königgrätz. During the Franco-Prussian War, the regiment participated as part of the 11th Infantry Division of the VI Army Corps, and was involved in several outpost skirmishes as well as during the Siege of Paris.

Following the end of the World War I, the unit marched towards Hohensalza and Mogilno on 24 November 1918. The unit served with Grenzschutz Ost from 27 November until 20 December 1918, and was subsequently demobilized.

== Uniforms and equipment ==
During the Napoleonic Wars, soldiers of the 18th Infantry Regiment were given dark blue coats with rose red collars and cuffs. The shoulder straps were white, and each with a brass button. Soldiers were issued with gray trousers during the winter and white trousers during the summer. The crossbelts and waistbelts were white for musketeers and black for fusiliers. Some soldiers wore peaked caps instead of shakos. Soldiers in the 1st Battalion wore a gray peaked cap with a rose red band. The band in the peaked cap is yellow for soldiers in the 2nd Battalion, and the cap is dark blue with a rose red band for soldiers in the 3rd Battalion. The greatcoats issued were usually gray.
