= 2nd Guards Field Artillery Regiment =

Military unit

The 2nd Guards Field Artillery Regiment (German: 2. Garde-Feldartillerie-Regiment) was an artillery unit in the Prussian Army prior to and during the First World War. The regiment was part of the 4th Guards Infantry Division.

== See also ==
- List of Imperial German artillery regiments
