= 5th Guards Infantry Brigade =

Imperial German Army unit

The 5th Guards Infantry Brigade (German: 5. Garde-Infanterie-Brigade) was a unit in the Imperial German Army prior to and during the First World War. At the outbreak of war, it was part of the 3rd Guards Infantry Division of the Guards Reserve Corps and consisted of the 5th Foot Guards and 5th Guards Grenadiers. In May 1915, the brigade was transferred to the newly created 4th Guards Infantry Division; at about the same time, in accordance with the regulated increase in brigade size from two to three regiments, the 93rd Reserve Infantry Regiment was assigned to the unit.

In 1917, the unit served in the area around Craonne, Winterberg and the Winterberg tunnel, where their attack with the reserve division against the Allies in July 1917 was supported by mortar fire.
