= 4th Foot Guards (German Empire) =

Infantry regiment of the Royal Prussian Army

4th Guards Regiment of Foot
- Active: 5 May 1860 – June 1919
- Disbanded: June 1919
- Country: Kingdom of Prussia
- Allegiance: King of Prussia
- Branch: Prussian Army
- Type: Infantry
- Role: Foot guards
- Size: Infantry regiment
- Part of: Guards Corps; 2nd Guards Division; 4th Guards Infantry Brigade
- Garrison: Berlin
- Anniversaries: 5 May
- Engagements: Second Schleswig War; Austro-Prussian War; Franco-Prussian War; World War I

Commanders
- Notable commanders: Erich von Falkenhayn

The 4th Guards Regiment of Foot (German: 4. Garde-Regiment zu Fuß) was an infantry regiment of the Royal Prussian Army. The regiment was formed in 1860. It served with the Guards Corps in the Second Schleswig War, the Austro-Prussian War, the Franco-Prussian War, and World War I. The regiment was disbanded in June 1919.

== History ==
The regiment was established on 5 May 1860 as the 2nd Combined Guards Infantry Regiment (German: 2. kombiniertes Garde-Infanterie-Regiment) during the reorganization of the Prussian Army, and received the designation 4. Garde-Regiment zu Fuß on 4 July 1860. The regiment formed part of the Guards Corps and served in the Second Schleswig War, the Austro-Prussian War, and the Franco-Prussian War. It was subsequently stationed in Berlin and formed part of the permanent guard establishment of the Prussian capital.

During the suppression of the Boxer Rebellion, four officers, six non-commissioned officers, and 43 enlisted men from the regiment volunteered for service in China. Volunteers from the regiment also took part in suppressing the rebellion of the Herero and Nama in German South West Africa.

During the First World War, the regiment served with the German field army on the Western Front as part of the Guards formations. It participated in operations during the German advance through Belgium and France and subsequently fought in the major campaigns of the Western Front. The regiment was demobilized after the Armistice and was finally disbanded in June 1919. Among its notable former officers was Paul von Lettow-Vorbeck, who began his military career in the regiment before becoming the commander of the German forces in German East Africa during the First World War.

Through a decree issued on 24 August 1921 by the Chief of the Army Command, General of the Infantry Hans von Seeckt, the 10th Company of the 9th (Prussian) Infantry Regiment was established as a bearer of tradition within the Reichswehr.

== See also ==
- List of Imperial German infantry regiments
