= 5th Guards Grenadiers =

- Garde-Grenadier-Regiment Nr. 5
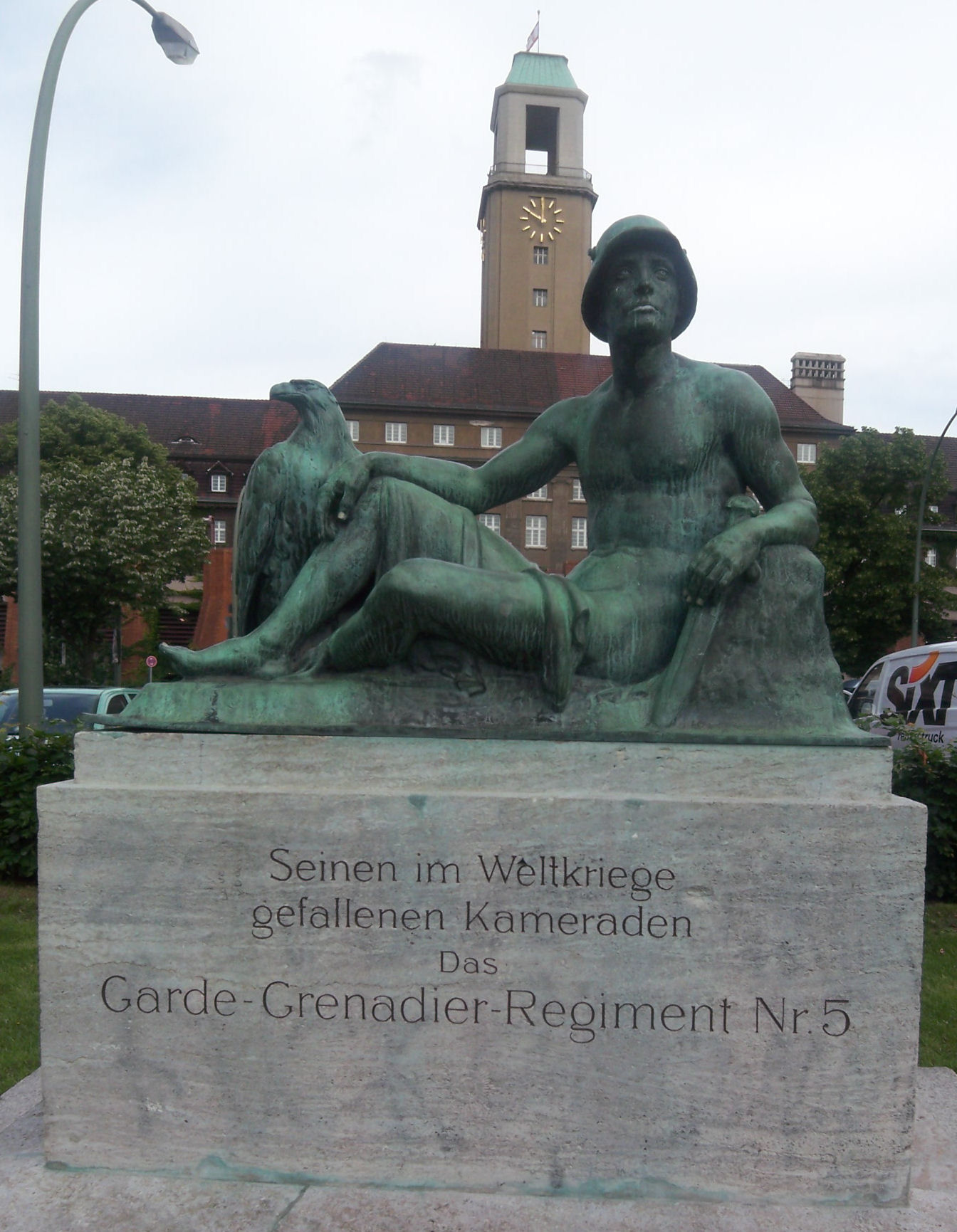
- A memorial to the soldiers of the regiment in Spandau
- Active: 31 March 1897–12 December 1918
- Disbanded: 12 December 1918
- Country: German Empire
- Allegiance: Kingdom of Prussia
- Branch: Infantry
- Type: Grenadiers
- Part of: Guards Corps
- Garrison/HQ: Spandau
- Nickname: Briefträger (post men)

Commanders
- Ceremonial chief: Grand Duke Konstantin Konstantinovich of Russia
- Notable commanders: Eberhard von der Lancken; Kurt von Manteuffel; Eberhard von Claer; Johannes von Eben; Karl Heinrich von Hänisch; Hans von Langermann und Erlenkamp; Axel von Petersdorff; Walter Randt; Wilhelm Reinhard; Walter Randt; Kurt von Beerfelde; Karl von Kietzell

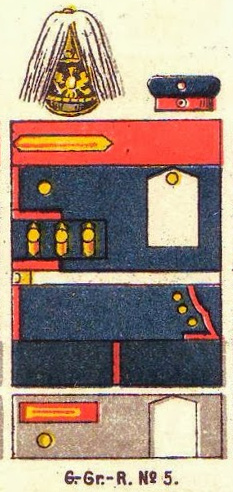
Uniform Detail of the Regiment

The 5th Guard Grenadiers (German: Garde-Grenadier-Regiment Nr. 5) was a regiment of the Prussian Army prior to and during the First World War.

Established in 1897, it was raised in Spandau. It was the last Guard Grenadier regiment. The regiment was part of the 3rd Guards infantry Division at the start of the war Before transferring to the 5th Guard Infantry Brigade. The regiment was sent to The Eastern Front before being sent to the Western Front in 1917, where it would stay for the rest of the war.

The regiment was disbanded following the war and perpetuated by 5th and 6th Company, 4th Infantry Regiment of the Reichswehr.

== See also ==
- List of Imperial German infantry regiments
