= 5th Foot Guards (German Empire) =

5th Foot Guards: 5. Garde-Regiment zu Fuß
- Active: 1897-1918
- Disbanded: 1919
- Country: German Empire
- Branch: Prussian Army
- Type: Guards infantry
- Part of: 5th Guards Infantry Brigade
- Garrison/HQ: Spandau
- Nickname: White Devils
- Engagements: World War I: Poland; Russia; Lithuania; Belgium; France

The 5th Guard Regiment of Foot (German: 5. Garde-Regiment zu Fuß) was a regiment in the Prussian Army prior to and during the First World War. Established in 1897, it was part of the 5th Guards Infantry Brigade and the 2nd Guards Division. During peacetime the regiment was garrisoned in Spandau.

== History ==
=== World War I ===
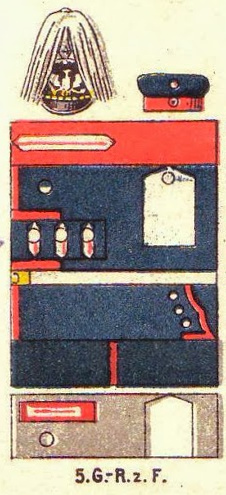
Uniform Details of the Regiment

With the outbreak of World War I, the regiment (as part of the 5th Guard Infantry Brigade) was transferred to the 3rd Guard Infantry Division of the Guards Reserve Corps. The regiment participated in the invasion of Belgium in August 1914; in late August the Guard Reserve Corps was transferred to the eastern theater of the war and the regiment took part in fighting in Poland, Russia and then later Lithuania. It was during this time that the regiment acquired the nickname "The White Devils" from the Russian because of the unit's distinctive white braid (Litzen).

In May 1915, the 5th Guard Infantry Brigade was used to form the new 4th Guard Infantry Division. This division would become one of the German army's best, and the regiment would find itself engaged in some of the most significant battles of the war.

From November 1915, until the end of the war it fought on the western front, namely on the Somme, Arras, Flanders, and during the Spring Offensive of 1918.

During the war, just over 4,000 men of the regiment were killed. Commanders during the war were Oberst von Hülsen, Oberstleutnant von Radowitz and Major von Kriegsheim.

=== Post-WWI ===
In 1919, the last remaining soldiers of the regiment formed the "Detachement Maltzan", a Freikorps ready for use in the Baltic.

== Legacy ==
In Spandau there is a memorial in memory of the killed soldiers of the 5th Foot Guards. The regiment was disbanded following the war and perpetuated by 6th Company, 5th Infantry Regiment of the Reichswehr in Angermünde, Brandenburg.

== See also ==
- List of Imperial German infantry regiments
