= Battle of Königinhof =

Battle during the Austro-Prussian War

- Part of the Austro-Prussian War
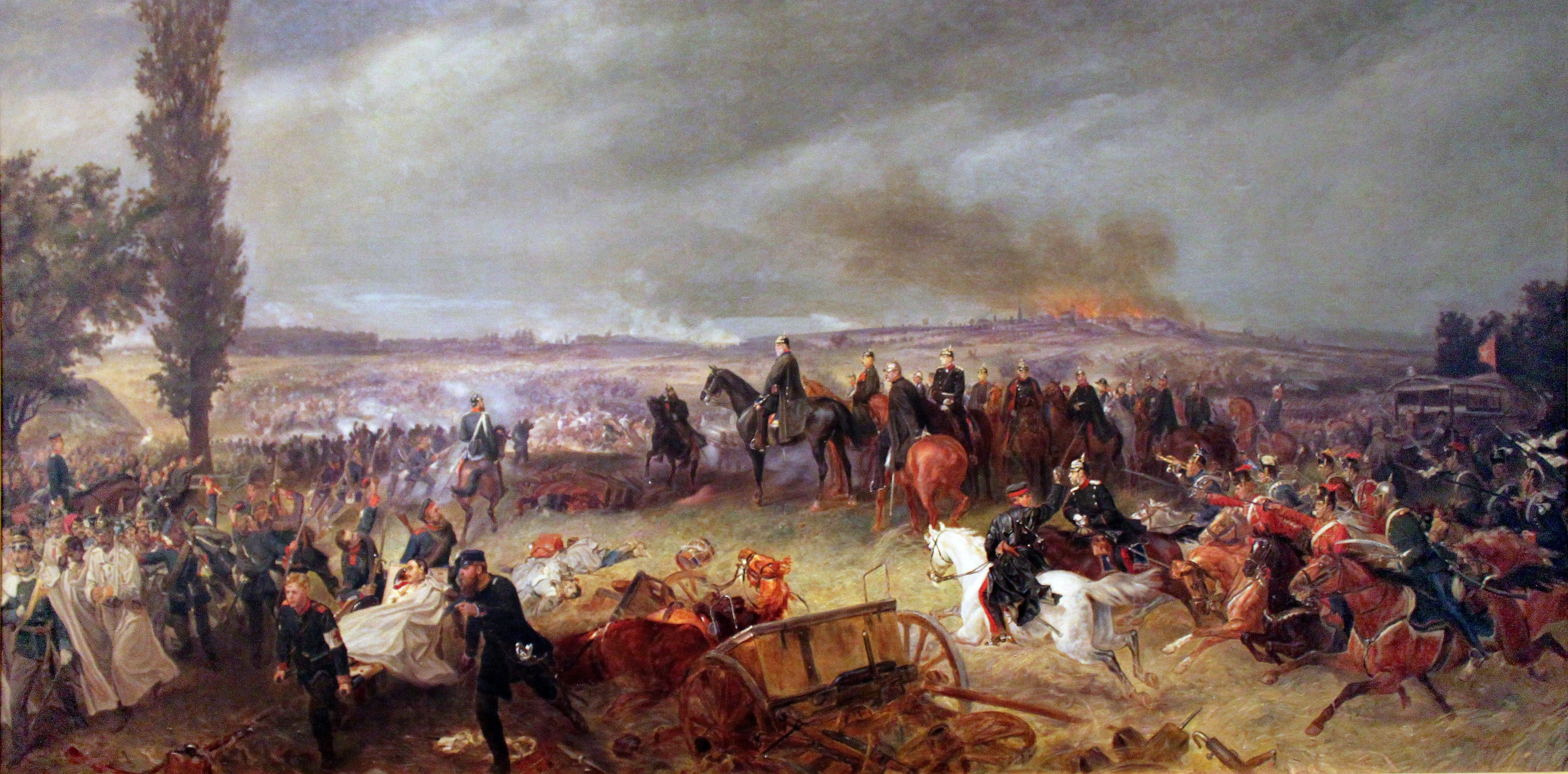
Date	29 June 1866
Location	Königinhof, Austrian Empire (present–day Czech Republic)
Result	Prussian victory

Belligerents
Prussia	Austria

Commanders and leaders
(Kingdom of Prussia) Prince August of Württemberg; (Kingdom of Prussia) Colonel Bernhard von Kessel	(Austrian Empire) Ludwig von Gablenz; (Austrian Empire) Colonel von Stocklin

Units involved
(Kingdom of Prussia) Guard Corps: (Kingdom of Prussia) 1st Foot Guards; (Kingdom of Prussia) 2nd Foot Guards	(Austrian Empire) IV Corps: (Austrian Empire) Coronini Infantry Regiment No. 6; (Austrian Empire) X Corps

Strength
Unknown	15,000–20,000

Casualties and losses
Unknown	400 captured

The Battle of Königinhof was a battle of the Austro-Prussian War, taking place in the town of Königinhof. As one of the preliminary engagements leading up to the Battle of Königgrätz, it resulted in a victory for Prussian forces despite stiff Austrian resistance.

== Prelude ==
Prior to the battle, the Prussian I Corps had been defeated at the Battle of Tratenau. Subsequently, the I Corps lost its role as the leading force, and was replaced by the Prussian Guard Corps under Prince August of Württemberg. Ludwig von Gablenz withdrew his exhausted troops from Tratenau to Soor, and requested reinforcements from Field Marshal Ludwig von Benedek, aiming to divert the Guard troops advance towards Staudenz. This led to the Battle of Burkersdorf, where the Prussian Guard Corps were able to defeat the Austrians.

Following orders of the Chief of General Staff Hellmuth von Moltke, the Guard Corps aimed to link up with the I Army Corps and V Army Corps. General von Moltke expected that the entirety of the Prussian II Army under Crown Prince Frederick would meet up between the towns of Gradlitz and Königinhof.

== Battle ==
The bulk of the Austrian IV Corps had withdrawn southwest towards the town of Königinhof. On the morning of 29 June 1866, the Prussian 1st Guards Infantry Division advanced west towards Königinhof. The Austrian troops in the town were able to hold out against the Prussians, supported by artillery batteries from the Austrian X Corps.

In the afternoon, the vanguard of the Prussian forces under Colonel von Kessel emerged from the Königreich Forest, supported by two artillery batteries. While the vanguard continued its advance, cannon fire proved ineffective due to the great distance. The first skirmishes occurred between the Prussian forces and Colonel von Stocklin's forces. Lieutenant Colonel Waldersee, who led the Guard Fusilier Regiment, immediately deployed his men and attempted to outflank the Austrians. As Waldersee deployed the 10th, 11th, and 12th Companies, the Austrians quickly withdrew from their positions outside the city into the town itself.

Colonel von Stocklin's men had taken fortified positions at the northern entrance to the city. However, the main body of the Guard Corps had begun arriving, and as a result, the Prussians were able to break their lines in their initial assault. As the 1st Foot Guards and the Prussian Guard Fusiliers pressed into the town, skirmishes in the city ensued, and the Austrians became increasingly cornered. In the ensuing chaos, the Coronini Infantry Regiment had lost its regimental colors, leading to a large part of the regiment surrendering to the Prussians. The Prussians advanced towards the Elbe bridges, and captured the upper bridge over the Elbe, forcing another part of the Austrian forces to surrender.

The 9th Company of the 2nd Foot Guards was then ordered to the southern bridge on the Elbe, with the intent of capturing the bridge. They were accompanied by the Guards Pioneers, who were instructed to blow up the bridge should the Austrians attempt to re-enter the town. The company held out under Austrian artillery fire before being relieved by the Grenadier Battalion of the 2nd Foot Guards.

In the aftermath of the fighting, the Prussian Guard Corps concentrated in Königinhof, while the Prussian I Corps moved to Pilnikau. The Prussian V Corps moved towards Gradlitz following its victory at the Battle of Schweinschadel.
