= Hans von Plessen =

Prussian military general (1841–1929)

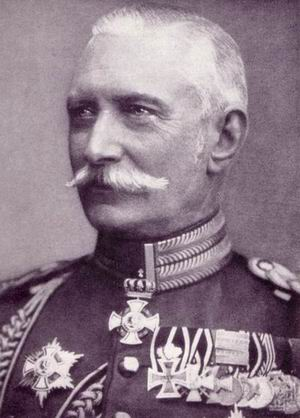
- Generaloberst von Plessen in 1914
- Born: 26 November 1841; Berlin-Spandau, Kingdom of Prussia
- Died: 28 January 1929 (aged 87); Potsdam, Germany
- Military career
- Allegiance: Prussia; German Empire
- Service years: 1861–1918
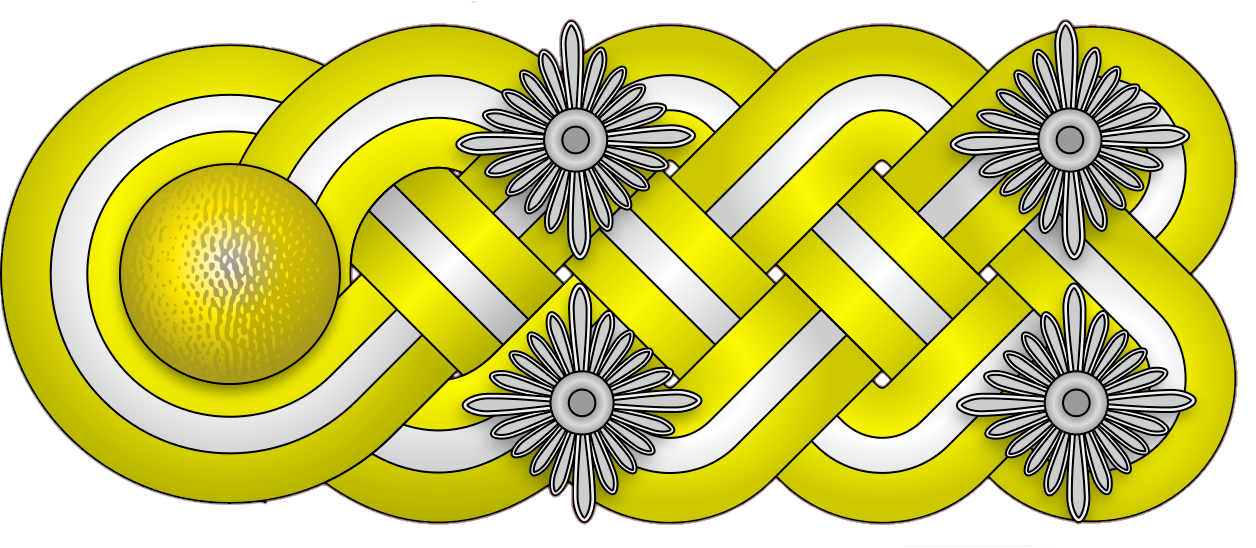
- Rank: Generaloberst mit dem Range als Generalfeldmarschall
- Commands: 1. Garde-Regiment zu Fuß; 55. Infanterie-Brigade; 1. Garde-Infanterie-Division; Imperial Grand Headquarters
- Conflicts: Second Schleswig War; Austro-Prussian War; Franco-Prussian War; World War I
- Awards: Order of the Red Eagle; Pour le Mérite

Hans Georg Hermann von Plessen (26 November 1841 – 28 January 1929) was a Prussian Colonel General with the rank of Generalfeldmarschall and Canon of Brandenburg. He held the office of His Majesty's Orderly Adjutant General (German: SM diensttuender Generaladjutant) to Kaiser Wilhelm II, thus making him one of the Emperor's closest confidants. During World War I he simultaneously served as Commandant of the Imperial Grand Headquarters.

By 1918, he was the oldest serving officer in the Imperial German Army, although Paul von Hindenburg falsely claimed this for himself. Von Plessen also was a recipient of the Pour le Mérite, Germany's highest military honor. He remained devoted to the Kaiser until the collapse of the monarchy in November 1918.

== Life ==
Hans von Plessen was born in 1841 as the son of General Hermann von Plessen. He joined the military in 1861 as an officer cadet. He was on duty during the Second Schleswig War but didn't participate in the war, serving in the Rhineland as a Second-Lieutenant. During the Austro-Prussian War, Plessen fought in the Battle of Königgrätz. As a brigade adjutant, he served in the Franco-Prussian War and participated in the Loire Campaign and the Battle of Le Mans. After the war, he became a general staff officer. In 1872, he was promoted to Hauptmann. Plessen married Elisabeth von Langenbeck in January 1874, a marriage resulting in two sons. Elisabeth was the daughter of Bernhard von Langenbeck.

In 1877, he became a staff officer in the 1st Guards Infantry Division under Alexander August Wilhelm von Pape. In 1879, Plessen was promoted to Major and in December became an aide-de-camp of German Emperor Wilhelm I. In 1885, Plessen became an Oberstleutnant. In 1888, he became the commander of the 1st Foot Guards, being promoted to Oberst on 4 August 1888.

He was made a Generalmajor on 9 February 1891 and received command of the 55th Infantry Brigade. In 1892, he became an adjutant general to Emperor Wilhelm II. He was promoted to Generalleutnant in 1894 and to General der Infantrie in 1899. In 1907, Plessen replaced Berhard von Werder as largely ceremonial head of the Mounted Feldjäger Corps, a company-strength unit of officers serving as couriers. In 1908, he received the rank of Generaloberst. During World War I, he continued to serve as adjutant general and was Commandant of the Imperial Grand Headquarters in the field. He was awarded the prestigious Pour le Mérite on 24 March 1918.

On 17 November 1918, after accompanying the emperor into exile, he was retired with the rank of Generaloberst mit dem Range als Generalfeldmarschall.

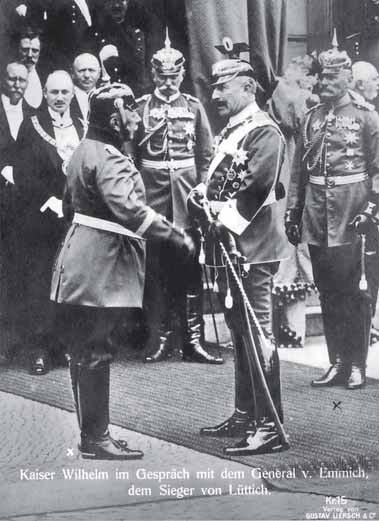
General von Plessen (center) observes Wilhelm II speaking with General Otto von Emmich, victor of the Battle of Liège, 1914

== Awards ==
German honours

- Knight of the Order of the Red Eagle, 4th Class with Swords, 1866; 2nd Class with Oak Leaves, Swords on Ring and Crown, 1893; with Star, 12 September 1896; Grand Cross
- Knight of the Order of the Black Eagle, with Collar and in Diamonds 23.09.1911
- Knight of the Order of the Prussian Crown, 1st Class
- Grand Commander's Cross of the Royal House Order of Hohenzollern, with Swords
- Iron Cross, 2nd Class 1870; 1st Class, 1914
- Pour le Mérite (military), 24 March 1918
- Grand Cross of the Order of the Zähringer Lion, with Oak Leaves, 1899
- Grand Cross of the Order of Berthold the First, 1901
- Knight of the House Order of Fidelity, 1905
- Grand Cross of the Order of Merit of the Bavarian Crown, 1902
- Knight of the Order of Saint Hubert, 1906
- Grand Cross of the Military Merit Order, with Swords
- Grand Cross of the Order of Henry the Lion, 1896
- Grand Cross of the Saxe-Ernestine House Order
- Grand Cross of the Order of Philip the Magnanimous, 15 October 1894
- Grand Cross of the Ludwig Order, 22 August 1904
- Grand Cross of the House Order of the Wendish Crown, with Golden Crown
- Knight of the Order of the Rue Crown
- Knight of the Military Order of Saint Henry
- Grand Cross of the Albert Order, with Golden Star and Silver Crown
- Grand Cross of the Friedrich Order, 1896
- Grand Cross of the Order of the Württemberg Crown, 1899

Foreign honours

- Grand Cross of the Order of Franz Joseph, 1893
- Knight of the Order of the Iron Crown, 1st Class, 1895
- Grand Cross of the Imperial Order of Leopold, 1897; in Diamonds, 1900
- Grand Cross of the Order of Saint Stephen, 1903; in Diamonds, 1908
- Grand Cordon of the Order of Leopold
- Grand Cross of the Order of Saint Alexander
- Grand Cross of the Order of the Dannebrog, in Diamonds, 3 July 1907
- Grand Cross of the Order of the Redeemer
- Grand Cross of the Order of Prince Danilo I
- Grand Cross of the Order of Saint Olav, 15 December 1906
- Order of the Lion and the Sun, 1st Class in Diamonds
- Grand Cross of the Military Order of Saint Benedict of Aviz
- Knight of the Order of Saint Andrew
- Knight of the Order of Saint Alexander Nevsky, in Diamonds
- Grand Cross of the Order of Charles III, 2 November 1905
- Knight of the Order of the Seraphim, 6 August 1908
- Honorary Grand Cross of the Royal Victorian Order, 23 November 1899

== Dates of rank ==
- Fähnrich—1 September 1861
- Leutnant—11 November 1862
- Oberleutnant—22 March 1868
- Hauptmann—16 April 1872
- Major—18 May 1879
- Oberstleutnant—14 July 1885
- Oberst—4 August 1888
- Generalmajor—9 February 1891
- Generalleutnant—14 May 1894
- Generaloberst—19 September 1908
- Generaloberst mit dem Rang als Generalfeldmarschall—17 November 1918
