= Battle of Burkersdorf =

The Battle of Burkersdorf may refer to:

- Battle of Burkersdorf (1762)
- Battle of Burkersdorf (1866)
