= 1st Guards Infantry Division (German Empire) =

- 1. Garde-Infanterie-Division
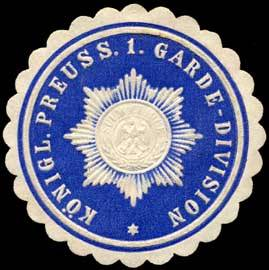
- A Sealing Stamp of the 1st Guards Infantry Division
- Active: 5 September 1818 – 30 April 1919
- Country: Kingdom of Prussia; German Empire
- Branch: Prussian Army; Imperial German Army
- Type: Imperial guard
- Size: Division
- Part of: Guards Corps
- Garrison/HQ: Berlin
- Engagements: Austro-Prussian War; Franco-Prussian War; World War I

Commanders
- Notable commanders: Helmuth von Moltke the Younger; Prince Eitel Friedrich

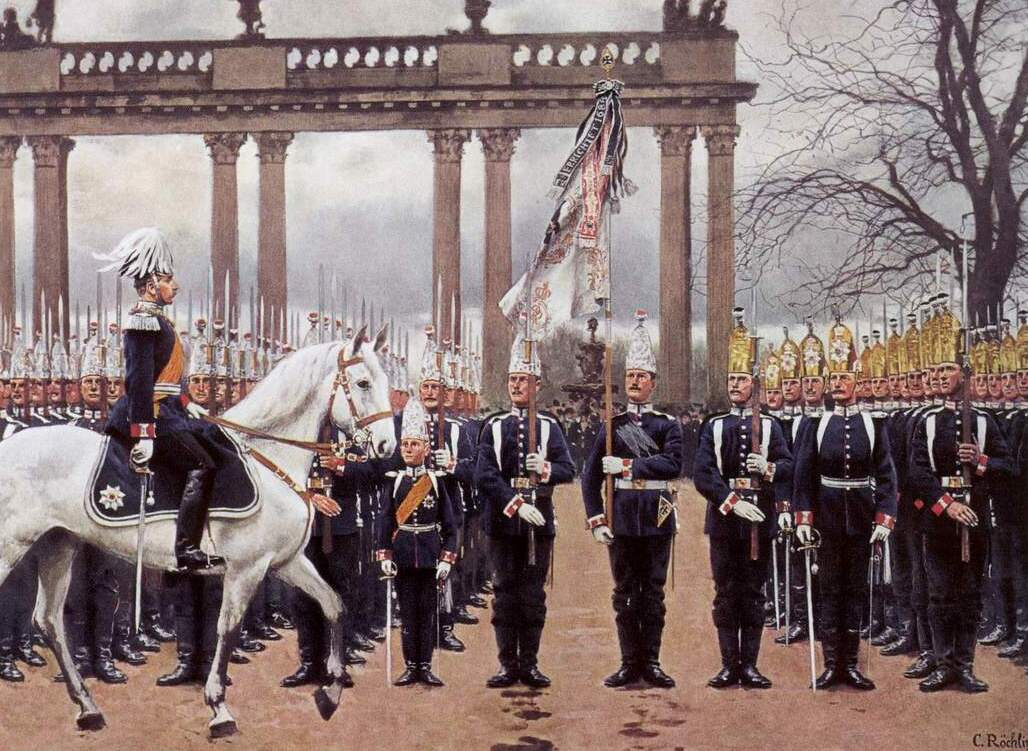
1. Garde-Regiment zu Fuß (Painting by Carl Röchling, 1894)

The 1st Guards Infantry Division (German: 1. Garde-Infanterie-Division) was a royal guard (later imperial guard) unit of the Prussian (and later) Imperial German Army and was stationed in Berlin.

== Origins ==
The division was created on September 5, 1818 when the guards brigades, which had been created in 1813 and were assigned to various commands, were grouped into a single formation. Ernst Ludwig von Tippelskirch was appointed as the first commander of the division.

== Austro-Prussian War ==
The division was active during the Austro-Prussian War. It was commanded by Generalmajor Constantin von Alvensleben and part of the Second Army.

== Franco-Prussian War ==
During the Franco-Prussian War, the division was commanded by Generalmajor Alexander August Wilhelm von Pape. It was part of the Second Army, commanded by Prince Friedrich Karl of Prussia. Throughout the war 4 officers, 70 men, and 10 horses were killed.

Order of Battle: 1870

- 1st Guards Infantry Brigade
  - 1st Foot Guards
  - 3rd Foot Guards
  - Guards Fusilier Regiment
- 2nd Guards Infantry Brigade
  - 2nd Foot Guards
  - 4th Foot Guards
- Divisional Troops
  - Guards Jäger Battalion
  - Guards Hussars
  - 1st Foot Battalion, Guards Artillery

== Imperial German Army ==
By 1914 the division was subordinate to the Guards Corps of the Imperial German Army. At the outbreak of the First World War it was commanded by Gen-Lt. Oskar von Hutier. In April of 1915 Prince Eitel Friedrich took command of the division until October of 1918, when he was relieved by Eduard von Jena.

Order of Battle: 1914

- 1st Guards Infantry Brigade
  - 1st Foot Guards
  - 3rd Foot Guards
- 2nd Guards Infantry Brigade
  - 2nd Foot Guards
  - 4th Foot Guards
- 1st Guards Field Artillery Brigade
  - 1st Guards Field Artillery
  - 2nd Guards Field Artillery
- Guards Hussar Regiment (2nd, 3rd, and 5th Squadrons)
- 1st Company, Guards Pioneer Battalion
- 1st and 3rd Section, Guards Field Ambulance Company
- 1st Guards Divisional Pontoon Train
