= 1st Foot Guards (German Empire) =

18th and 19th century infantry regiment in the Royal Prussian Army

1st Foot Guard Regiment
- 1. Garde-Regiment zu Fuß
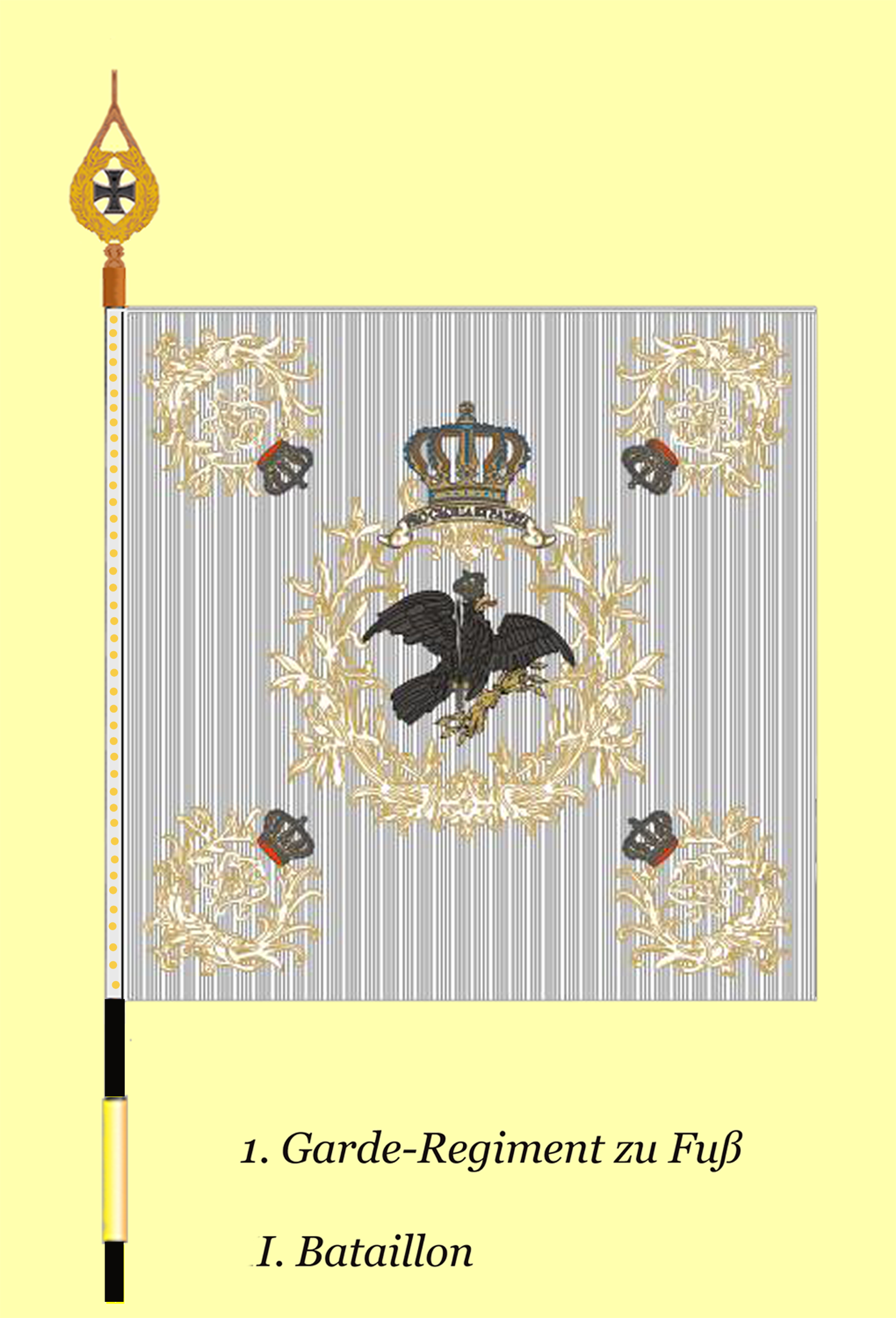
- Colors of the 1st Battalion, based on that of the 15th Infantry Regiment of the Old Prussian Army.
- Active: 1806–1919
- Country: Prussia; German Empire
- Allegiance: Prussian Army; Imperial German Army
- Branch: Army
- Type: Infantry regiment
- Garrison/HQ: Potsdam (1814–1919)
- Motto: Semper talis (Always the Same)
- March: Marsch I. Bataillon Garde (1806)
- Engagements: Napoleonic Wars; Franco-Prussian War; World War I

The 1st Foot Guard Regiment or 1st Guards Regiment of Foot (German: 1. Garde-Regiment zu Fuß) was an infantry regiment of the Prussian Army.

== History ==
The regiment was established in 1806 by combining Prussia's older Foot Guard Regiments, including the 6th and 15th Infantry Regiments of the Old Prussian Army, and was initially established under the name Guard Depot, although it was later renamed the Foot Guard Regiment. Except for Wilhelm II, who also wore the uniforms of other regiments, all Prussian Kings and most Princes of Prussia wore the uniform of the 1st Foot Guard Regiment. All Princes of Prussia were commissioned lieutenants in the 1st Foot Guards upon their tenth birthdays. The King of Prussia was also the Colonel-in-chief of the regiment, as well as the Chief of the 1st Battalion and 1st Company of the regiment. Therefore, the regiment held the highest rank within the Prussian Army, which, among other things, meant that the officer corps of the regiment marched before the princes of the German Empire and the diplomatic corps in the traditional New Year's reception. Unofficially, the regiment was known as the "First Regiment of Christendom" (German: Erstes Regiment der Christenheit).

Initially, the Guard Depot served as a depot for arriving soldiers from the older Guard units. On 24 January 1807, enough enlisted men and non-commissioned officers were now in the Guard Depot to allow it to organize into two companies. Second Lieutenant von Pogwisch retained command of the regiment, but also assumed command of the 1st Company. Second Lieutenant Heinrich Werner Friedrich von Below assumed command of the 2nd Company. In April, King Frederick William III decided to relieve Second Lieutenant von Pogwisch of command of the regiment, while allowing him to retain command of the 1st Company. On 16 April 1807, overall command of the regiment was handed over to Major Gustav von Kessel.

In May 1811, by a Prussian Cabinet order, a new battalion under the name Normal Infantry Battalion (German: Normal-Infanterie-Bataillon) was established, and was attached to the Foot Guard Regiment. The unit's main purpose was primarily a training and experimental unit, essentially establishing the "norm" for the infantry.

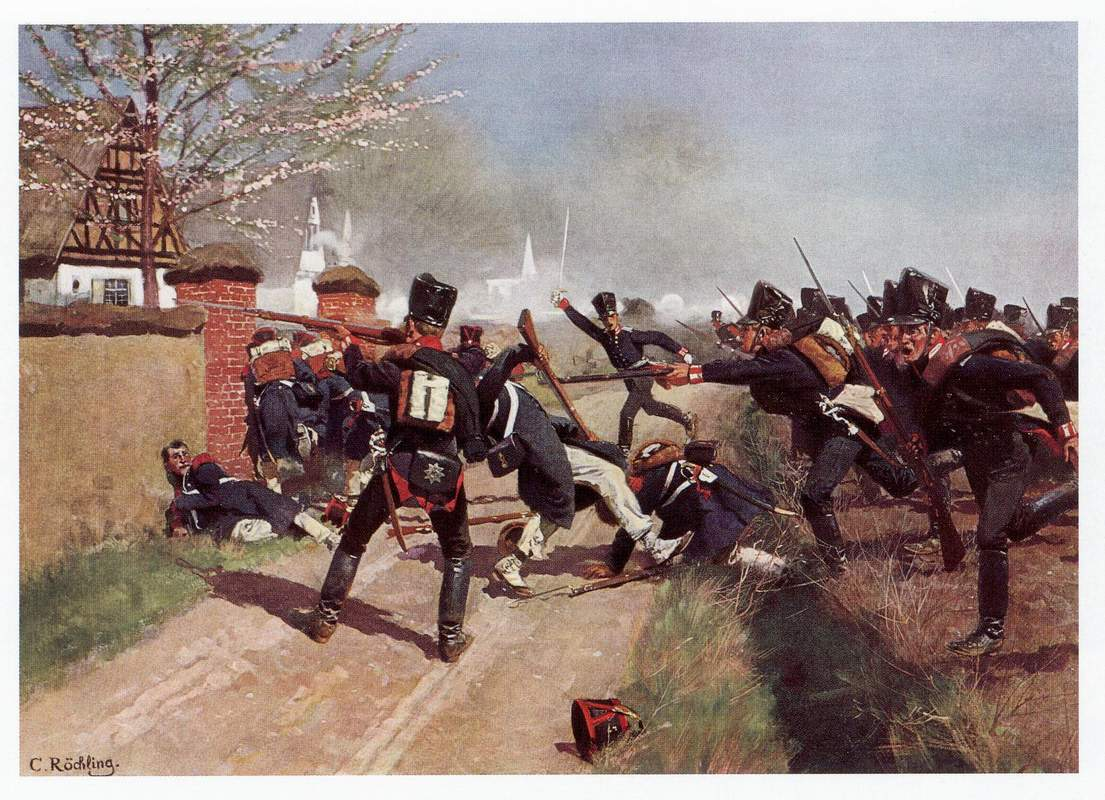
The regiment's Fusilier Battalion at Kaja during the Battle of Lützen

In April 1813, during the German campaign of 1813, the regiment advanced into Saxony, and participated in the Battle of Lützen. At Lützen, the regiment initially found itself in the second line of the Brandenburg Brigade at the village of Großgörschen. The regiment's Fusilier Battalion occupied the village of Kaja, and was then engaged in combat against advancing French columns supported by French artillery, eventually forcing the Prussians out of the town. The 2nd Battalion was brought past Großgörschen, but after their commanding officer, Major von Löwenstein-Werthheim, was shot, Major von Rohr assumed command of the battalion and marched the battalion towards Kaja, where he was then fatally shot. The regiment withdrew towards Rahna, and then had to retreat further behind the Prussian lines. The regiment's Normal Battalion was in the reserve for most of the battle, and only saw combat while escorting and defending a Russian artillery battery against French forces.

At the Battle of Bautzen, on 21 May 1813, the regiment supported Coalition positions around the villages of Bliskowitz and Preititz. During the battle, the regiment's 1st Battalion was commanded by Major von Grabow, while the regiment's 2nd Battalion was commanded by Major von Dittfurth, and the Fusilier Battalion was commanded by Major von Röder. The casualties amounted to two officers and 101 non-commissioned officers and privates.

During the Truce of Pläswitz, the Normal Battalion was transferred from the regiment to the 2nd Foot Guards on 20 June 1813, while the original Foot Guard Regiment was redesignated the 1st Foot Guard Regiment.

Following the Truce of Pläswitz, the regiment advanced towards Dresden via Teplitz, although the regiment did not actively participate in the Battle of Dresden. With the outbreak of the Battle of Leipzig on 16 October 1813, the regiment advanced around 11:00 towards the heights between Wachau and Gossa, and remained under cannon fire until the evening. The regiment did see much combat during the battle, remaining in the area near Wachau for the duration of the battle.

In 1814, the regiment participated in the Battle of Paris. While occupying Paris, the regiment stayed in the Pantemont Barracks. After leaving Paris, the majority of the regiment was then stationed in its new barracks in Priesterstraße, Potsdam, which was opposite of the Potsdam Garrison Church and diagonally across from the City Palace.

=== Austro-Prussian War ===
At the outbreak of the Austro-Prussian War in 1866, the last time the regiment had been mobilized was during the War of the Sixth Coalition. Aside from the German revolutions of 1848-49, the regiment had seen no combat since. On 5 May 1866, the regiment received orders to mobilize. Some officers were assigned to newly-forming reserve units or sent to collect reservists, horses, and equipment, while others were constantly arriving in the regiment. The first reservists arrived in the regiment at Potsdam on 8 May 1866. A total of 1,797 privates were incorporated into the regiment from the reserves.

On 3 June 1866, the regiment received orders to march towards the assembly area near Cottbus and from there await deployment to the frontlines. On 14 June, the regiment assembled in the Lustgarten to begin its march. On 15 June, the 1st Battalion began its march through Mollwitz, while the 2nd Battalion began its march on 16 June. On 22 June, the regiment received orders to begin its advance towards the Bohemian border, while the Guard Corps was ordered to advance towards Braunau. The regiment participated in many of the preliminary battles leading up to the Battle of Königgrätz, including the Battle of Trautenau, the Battle of Burkersdorf, and the Battle of Königinhof, during which the regiment captured the colours of the Austrian Coronini Infantry Regiment at Königinhof. The regiment then participated in the Battle of Königgrätz on 3 July 1866 as part of the 1st Guards Brigade of the Guard Corps.

=== Franco-Prussian War ===
During the Franco-Prussian War, the regiment participated in the Battle of Gravelotte, in which it attacked and suffered heavy casualties, including 16 officers and 348 enlisted men killed, along with 20 officers and 694 enlisted men wounded, as well as 14 enlisted men missing. The regiment also participated in the Battle of Sedan and the Siege of Paris.

=== First World War ===
At the outbreak of the First World War, the regiment was initially deployed on the Western Front, participating in the Battle of St. Quentin and the First Battle of the Marne, as well as in the First Battle of Ypres. The regiment remained on the Western Front from 1915 until 1917, participating in the Second Battle of Champagne. In 1917, the regiment was transferred to the Eastern Front in response to the Kerensky offensive, before being transferred back to the Western Front. In 1918, the regiment participated in the German spring offensive. By 9 November 1918, a total of 97 officers, 480 non-commissioned officers, and 4,025 enlisted men from the regiment had fallen throughout the First World War.

The regiment returned to its garrison in Potsdam on 11 December 1918, and underwent demobilization on 12 December 1918.

The regiment was disbanded in 1919 after the Imperial German Army was dissolved, with the Infantry Regiment 9 Potsdam of the new Reichsheer bearing its tradition. The Wachbataillon continues the tradition of this regiment in the Bundeswehr of the Federal Republic of Germany.

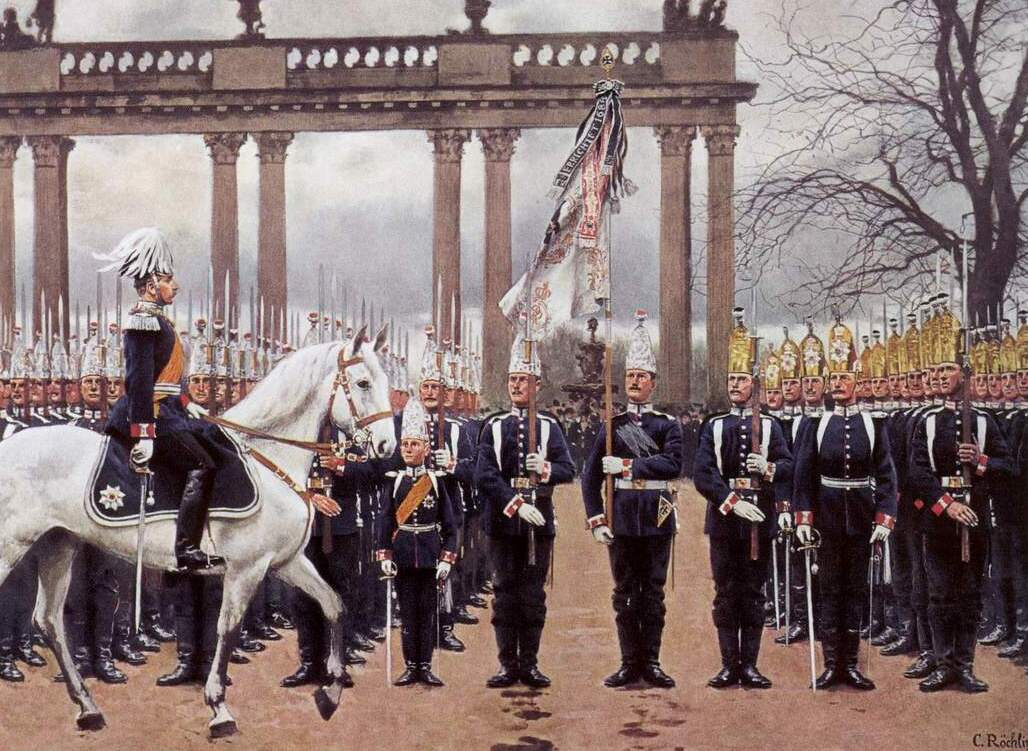
The grenadiers of the 1st Foot Guards on parade at the Lustgarten in Potsdam in 1894.

== Regimental commanders ==
The first regimental commander of the 1st Foot Guards was Second Lt. Julius Ludwig von Pogwisch, who served from 4 November 1806 to 15 April 1807. He was followed by Col. Gustav Adolph von Kessel (16 April 1807—20 Jan 1813). Subsequent commanders through the first half of the 19th century were Major Ernst Ludwig von Tippelskirch (9 Feb—20 June 1813); Major Friedrich Johann Carl Gebhard von Alvensleben (20 June 1813—5 April 1814); Lt. Col. Carl Heinrich von Block (7 April 1814—13 Feb 1816); Lt. Col. Eugen Max von Röder (13 Feb 1816—1 June 1828); Col. Carl Ludwig Wilhelm Ernst von Prittwitz (1 June 1828—20 Sep 1835); Col. Franz Karl von Werder (20 Sep 1835—25 March 1841); Col. George Leopold Carl von Gayl II (25 March 1841—27 March 1847); and Col. Karl Eberhard Herwarth von Bittenfeld (27 March 1847—4 May 1850).

Between 1850 and the beginning of the Franco-Prussian War were Col. Eduard von Brauchitsch (4 May 1850—4 Nov 1851); Col. Count Count Albert von Blumenthal (4 Nov 1851—5 Aug 1856); Col. Friedrich Wilhelm Johann Ludwig Freiherr Hiller von Gaertringen (5 Aug 1856—22 March 1859); Col. Karl Graf von der Goltz (22 March 1859—7 March 1863); and Col. Bernhard von Kessel III (7 March 1863—18 May 1867).

Col. Victor Friedrich Wilhelm Joseph Dietrich von Roeder's command, which started on 18 May 1867, extended into the start of the Franco-Prussian War. He was killed one month into the conflict on 18 August 1870 during the Battle of Gravelotte. Von Oppell served as acting commander until 11 December, when Col. Oktavio Philipp von Boehn took over. He held this position through the end of the war and was replaced by Col. Anton Wilhelm Karl von L'Estocq on 12 December 1874.

After the war, command of the 1st Foot Guards was held by Otto von Derenthall, first as an acting commander (28 Oct 1875—19 Oct 1876), then as commander (20 Sep 1876—23 Nov 1882). Following him were Col. Oskar von Lindequist (23 Nov 1882—27 Jan 1888); Col. Hans von Plessen (27 Jan 1888—9 Feb 1891); Col. Oldwig Wilhelm Ferdinand von Natzmer (9 Feb 1891—9 Feb 1893); Col. Gustav von Kessel (9 Feb 1893—21 March 1896); Col. Col Georg von Kalckstein (21 March 1896—15 June 1898); Lt. Col. Karl von Plettenberg (15 June 1898—22 March 1902); Gustav Freiherr von Berg (22 March 1902—16 October 1906); Karl Freiherr von Willisen (16 Oct 1906—22 March 1910); Friedrich von Kleist (22 March 1910—20 March 1911); and Friedrich von Friedeburg (20 March 1911—1 August 1914).

Prince Eitel Friedrich of Prussia began his command of the 1st Foot Guards on 1 August 1914, a few days after the beginning of World War I. He was replaced on 14 November by Friedrich von Bismarck, who was acting commander until his death in Bouvincourt-en-Vermandois. Siegfried Graf zu Eulenburg-Wicken and Friedrich Franz Adolf von Stephani alternated command through the end of the war: Eulenburg-Wicken (6 Nov 1916—28 April 1917); von Stephani (28 April 1917—7 July 1917); Eulenburg-Wicken (7 July 1917—27 Aug 1918); von Stephani (27 Aug—1 Sep 1918); Eulenburg-Wicken (1—26 Sep 1918); von Stephani (26—30 Sep 1918); and Eulenburg-Wicken (30 Sep—11 Dec 1918).

== Uniforms ==
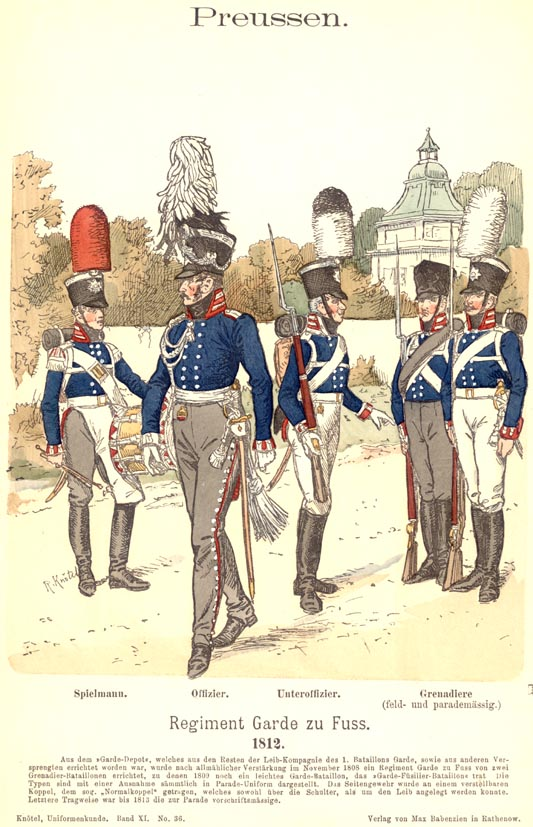
Uniforms of the 1st Foot Guards in 1812.

In 1807, soldiers wore a black shako adorned with a silver Gardestern on the front. On Sundays or during parades, a goose feather plume was worn on the shako. The plumes were worm by non-commissioned officers had individual black feathers at the base. For routine duty, a black linen cover was worn. The shakos worn by officers were made of finer felt, and featured a silver pom-pom. The star of the Order of the Black Eagle was adorned on the front of the shakos worn by officers, and featured silver-plated rays radiating from the center. The shakos issued in 1807 would remain unchanged until April 1814.

The coat was made of dark blue cloth and featured a low, open collar as well as open Swedish-style cuffs. The lining beneath the lapels, cuffs, and coat tails were made of red cloth. The coat features silver-colored buttons arranged in two columns of eight, and there were also two such buttons on each cuff, and another two at the waist. Until 4 April 1817, the coat and tails were lined with red and white cloth. A white shoulder strap secured with a silver-colored button was positioned on the left shoulder to hold the cartridge box bandolier.

Russian-style grenadier caps were awarded to the 2nd Grenadier Battalion on 30 March 1824. After the first parade with the grenadier caps, by a Cabinet Order on 10 August 1824, they were awarded to the 1st Grenadier Battalion. On 23 October 1842, the Pickelhaube was introduced into the Prussian Army. In contrast to other regiments, Pickelhauben issued to the 1st Foot Guards featured silver fittings, and were adorned with a silver-colored Gardeadler on the front, along with a Gardestern superimposed on it. Only the chin scales and screws on the officer's cruciform spike base were gilded. A simple tunic was also introduced to the regiment on the same date. The tunic kept the colors of the old tailcoat, being blue with red piping as well as red collars.

When the Feldgrau uniform and Stahlhelms were introduced in the regiment, the Feldgrau uniforms featured Swedish cuffs, nickel buttons, double white collar piping, and white piping on the shoulder straps. Stahlhelms issued to the regiment displayed the coat of arms of the House of Hohenzollern on them.

== Regimental colors ==
=== 1808–1889 ===
In around 1808, during the reorganization and restructuring of the Prussian Army, the regiment had received new regimental colors, with each battalion receiving one banner. The flag of the 1st Battalion featured a black Prussian war eagle in the center, bearing a drawn sword in one talon and a golden thunderbolt in the other, and placed within a round silver medallion. This medallion is encircled by embroidered silver laurel wreaths. Above the medallion is a crown. Beneath the crown, within the medallion, is a blue scroll with the inscription "Pro Patria et Gloria" (Latin: For Country and Glory) in silver lettering. In the four corners of the flag were the letters "FWR" encircled by laurel wreaths and a crown at the top, pointing towards the eagle. Between these, at the center of each side were four silver flaming grenades, with the flames directed towards the eagle.

== See also ==
- List of Imperial German infantry regiments
