= 1st Foot Guards (disambiguation) =

1st Foot Guards may refer to:

- Grenadier Guards, an infantry regiment of the British Army
- 1st Foot Guards (German Empire), an infantry regiment of the Royal Prussian Army formed in 1806
