= Military Order of St. Henry =

Military Order of St. Henry Militär-St. Heinrichs-Orden
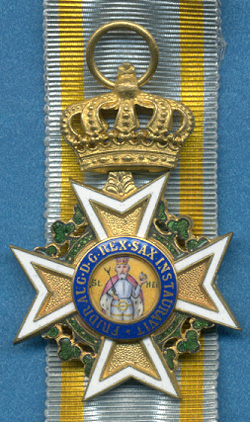
- Wearer's copy (Spangenstück) of a Knight's Cross, obverse and reverse
- Type: Military Order of Merit
- Awarded for: Bravery and military merit
- Description: gold Maltese cross with a white-enameled border; the center medallion, ringed in blue enamel, features a portrait of St. Henry. Suspended from a royal crown.
- Presented by: Electorate of Saxony; Kingdom of Saxony
- Eligibility: Saxon military officers and officers of allied states
- Status: Obsolete
- Established: October 7, 1736
- First award: 1736
- Final award: 1918
- Ribbon of the order

Precedence
- Next (higher): Order of the Rue Crown
- Next (lower): Albert Order

The Military Order of St. Henry (Militär-St. Heinrichs-Orden) was a military order of the Kingdom of Saxony, a member state of the German Empire. The order was the oldest military order of the states of the German Empire. It was founded on October 7, 1736 by Augustus III, King of Poland and Elector of Saxony. The order underwent several more revisions over the course of the 19th and early 20th centuries. It became obsolete with the fall of the Saxon monarchy in the wake of Germany's defeat in World War I.

== Classes ==
The order came in four classes: Grand Cross (Großkreuz), Commander's Cross 1st Class (Kommandeurkreuz I. Klasse), Commander's Cross 2nd Class (Kommandeurkreuz II. Klasse) or sometimes just Commander, and Knight's Cross (Ritterkreuz). Generally, the rank of the recipient determined which grade he would receive - the Grand Cross went to monarchs and the highest field commanders, the Commander 1st Class to senior generals, the Commander 2nd Class to officers major and above (with a few exceptions) and the Knight's Cross to all officers. Again with few exceptions, one was required to have received a lower grade before receiving the next higher grade. During World War I, there were 12 awards of the Grand Cross, 14 awards of the Commander 1st Class, 153 awards of the Commander 2nd Class, and 2,728 awards of the Knight's Cross As an example of the progression, Rupprecht, Crown Prince of Bavaria, a general and later field marshal, received the Knight's Cross in August 1914, the Commander 2nd Class in June 1915, the Commander 1st Class in January 1917, and the Grand Cross in May 1918.

== Description and wear ==
The badge of the order was a gold Maltese cross with white-enameled edges. Around the center medallion was a blue-enameled gold ring bearing on the obverse the words "FRIDR•AUG•D•G•REX•SAX•INSTAURAVIT" and on the reverse the motto "VIRTUTI IN BELLO" ("Bravery in War"). On the obverse, the medallion was yellow-enameled with a painted portrait of St. Henry, the last Saxon Holy Roman Emperor. On the reverse, the medallion bore the Saxon coat of arms (alternating horizontal black and gold stripes with a diagonal rue crown). Between the arms of the cross were green-enameled rue crowns, a symbol of Saxony. The badge was suspended from a royal crown. The Grand Cross was larger than the Commander's Cross, and the Commander's Cross was larger than the Knight's Cross.

The star of the order, awarded with the Grand Cross and the Commander 1st Class, was a silver eight-pointed star featuring a larger version of the medallion with St. Henry of the obverse of the cross, but with the text of the ring of the reverse. The star was slightly larger for the Grand Cross.

The ribbon of the order was light blue with yellow stripes near each edge.

The Knight's Cross was worn as a breast badge on the upper left chest. The Commander's Crosses were worn from the neck, with the breast star of the Commander 1st Class on the lower left chest. The Grand Cross was worn from a sash over the shoulder, with the badge resting on the left hip. Its star was worn as with the Commander 1st Class. On occasion, the Grand Cross badge was worn from the neck and was distinguishable from the Commander's Crosses only by its size.

== Notable recipients ==
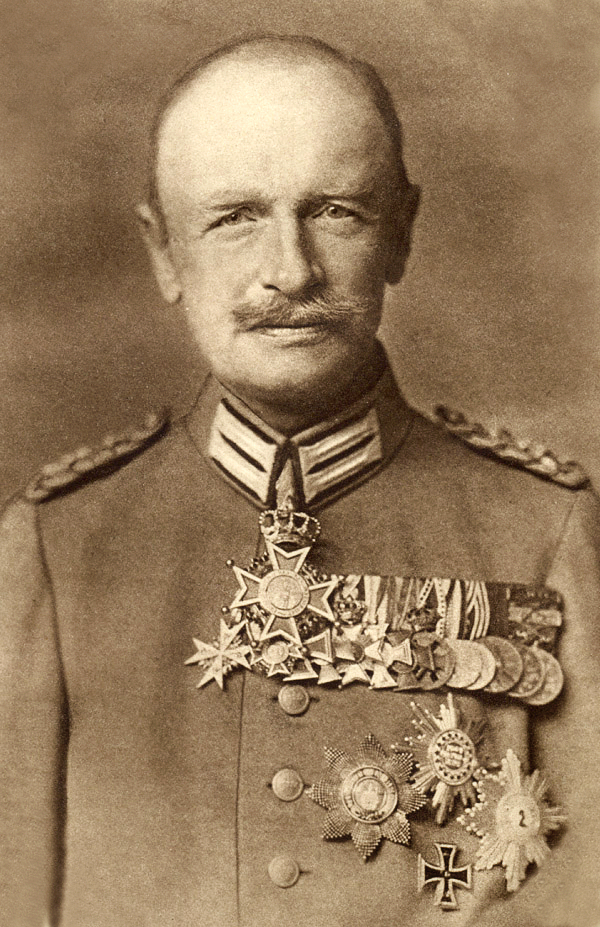
King Friedrich August III, wearing a special version of the Grand Cross as a neck badge, the breast star on his left chest, and the Knight's Cross on his medal bar.

=== Grand Crosses ===
- Albert of Saxony
- Alexander, Margrave of Meissen
- Michael Andreas Barclay de Tolly
- Prince Bernhard of Saxe-Weimar-Eisenach (1792–1862)
- Charles I of Austria
- Charles XIV John
- Louis-Nicolas Davout
- Ernest I, Duke of Saxe-Coburg and Gotha
- Franz Joseph I of Austria
- Frederick Augustus II of Saxony
- Frederick Augustus III of Saxony
- Frederick III, German Emperor
- Prince Friedrich Karl of Prussia (1828–1885)
- George, King of Saxony
- Josip Jelačić
- Paul von Hindenburg
- Maria Emanuel, Margrave of Meissen
- Helmuth von Moltke the Elder
- Rupprecht, Crown Prince of Bavaria
- Wilhelm II, German Emperor
- Wilhelm, German Crown Prince
- William I, German Emperor
- William II of Württemberg

=== Commanders 1st Class ===
- Gustav von Alvensleben
- Prince August of Württemberg
- Karl von Einem
- August Karl von Goeben
- Ernest II, Duke of Saxe-Coburg and Gotha
- Charles Joseph, comte de Flahaut
- Archduke Friedrich, Duke of Teschen
- Oskar von Hutier
- Hans von Kirchbach
- Prince Leopold of Bavaria
- August von Mackensen
- Emmanuel von Mensdorff-Pouilly
- Friedrich Sixt von Armin

=== Commanders 2nd Class ===
- Felix Graf von Bothmer
- Franz Conrad von Hötzendorf
- Karl Ludwig d'Elsa
- Hermann von Eichhorn
- Ernst II, Duke of Saxe-Altenburg
- Max Immelmann
- Maximilian von Laffert
- Fritz von Loßberg
- Charles Antoine Morand
- Alexander August Wilhelm von Pape
- Johann Pflugbeil
- Ferdinand von Quast
- Remus von Woyrsch

=== Knights ===
- Prince Eitel Friedrich of Prussia
- Erich von Falkenhayn
- Prince Karl Theodor of Bavaria
- Karl Theodor, Duke in Bavaria
- Erich Ludendorff
- Karl August Nerger
- Hans von Plessen
- Manfred von Richthofen
- Otto Weddigen
- Maximilian Wengler
- Georg Zeumer
- George Albert, Prince of Schwarzburg-Rudolstadt

=== Unknown ===
- Otto von Below
- Eduard von Böhm-Ermolli
- Dietrich von Choltitz
- Georg, Crown Prince of Saxony
- Edmond de Talleyrand-Périgord
- Max von Gallwitz
- Max Hoffmann
- Alexander von Linsingen
- Friedrich Olbricht
