= Battle of Burkersdorf (1866) =

Coordinates: 50°31′0″N 15°55′24″E

- Part of Austro-Prussian War
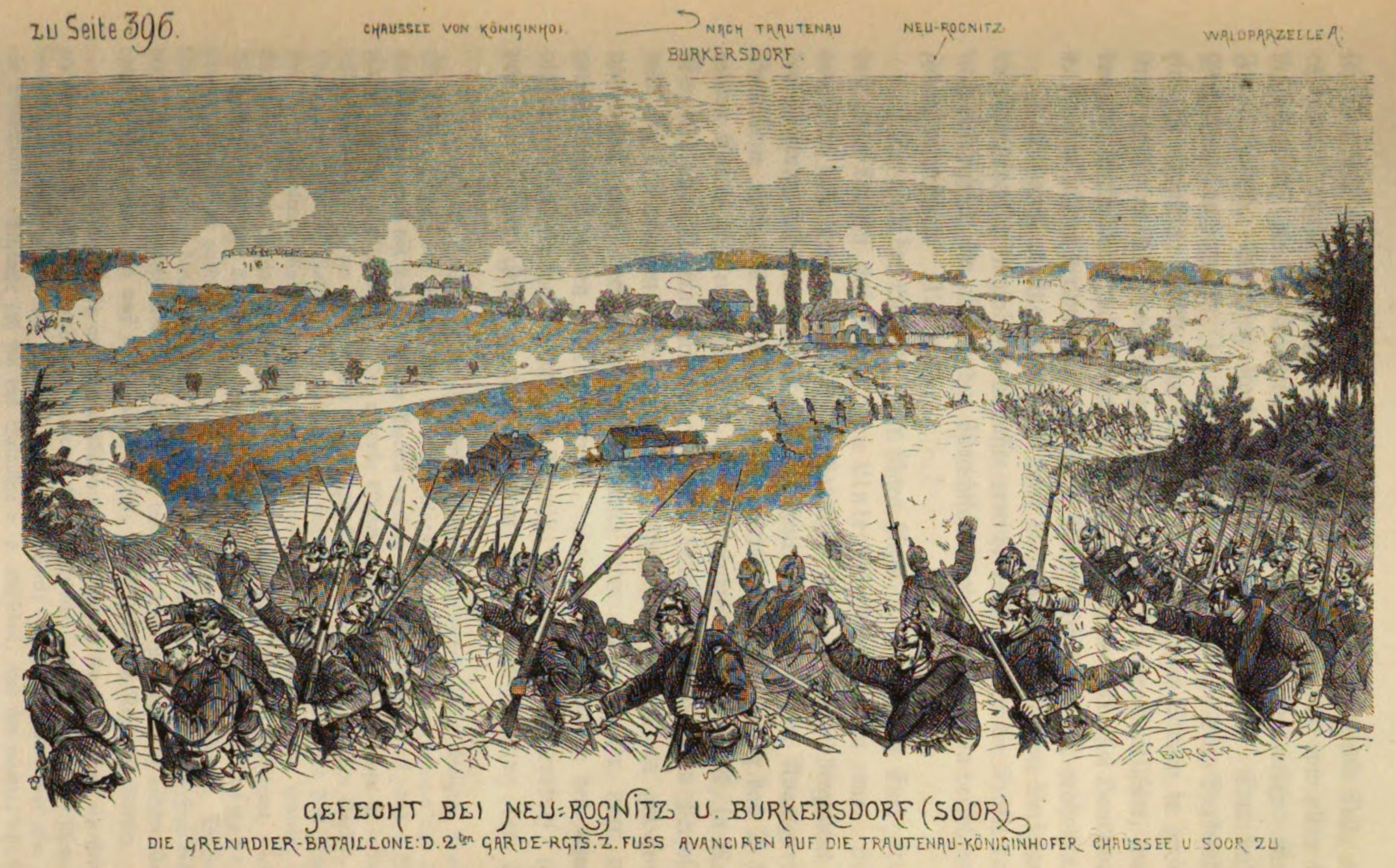
- Skirmish at Neu-Rognitz and Burkersdorf amd Soor, 28 June 1866 (illustration by L. Burger, 1871)
Date	28 June 1866
Location	Střítež, Bohemia (today a part of Trutnov in the Czech Republic)
Result	Prussian victory

Belligerents
Prussia	Austrian Empire

Commanders and leaders
(Kingdom of Prussia) Crown Prince Friedrich (Kingdom of Prussia) Prince August	(Austrian Empire) Ludwig von Gablenz

Strength
Guard Corps	X Corps

Casualties and losses
713	3,819

The Battle of Burkersdorf was fought on 28 June 1866, during the Austro-Prussian War. It featured the Austrian X Corps against the Prussian Guard Corps and ended in a Prussian victory.

== Burkersdorf (Střítež) ==
After having beaten back Bonin's I Corps at Trautenau in the only Austrian victory against the Prussians, Glabenz's position became untenable due to the Austrian loss at Náchod and the Prussian Guard Corps' advance towards Úpice, and he was ordered to retreat towards Dolní Brusnice to block the Prussian Guards. At 9:00 AM Prussian hussars scouted X Corps decamping from the heights near Trautenau, and the Prussian Guard commander ordered an advance towards Deutsch-Prausnitz, south of Trautenau. Meanwhile, having received his marching orders at 7:00 AM, Glabenz lost time in ordering the retreat and he decided to send his Grivicic brigade to Radec to hit the Prussian Guard in the flank. At 8:00 near Burkersdorf Glabenz marching columns encountered the 2nd Prussian Guard brigade. Glabenz deployed his Knebel and Mondel brigades in a defensive semi-circle. The Austrian 64 gun main battery was able to hold the Prussians for an hour but at 9:30 AM they broke through to Burkersdorf (Střítež). Having been able to shift the majority of his Corps westwards to Pilníkov, Glabenz left a regiment from Knebel's brigade behind as rear guard to hold up the Prussians at Burkersdorf. By 10:00 AM the town was taken by the Prussian Guards only after heavy fighting which cost them 500 men. The Austrian rear guard then joined Glabenz's retreat.

== Rudersdorf (Rubínovice) ==
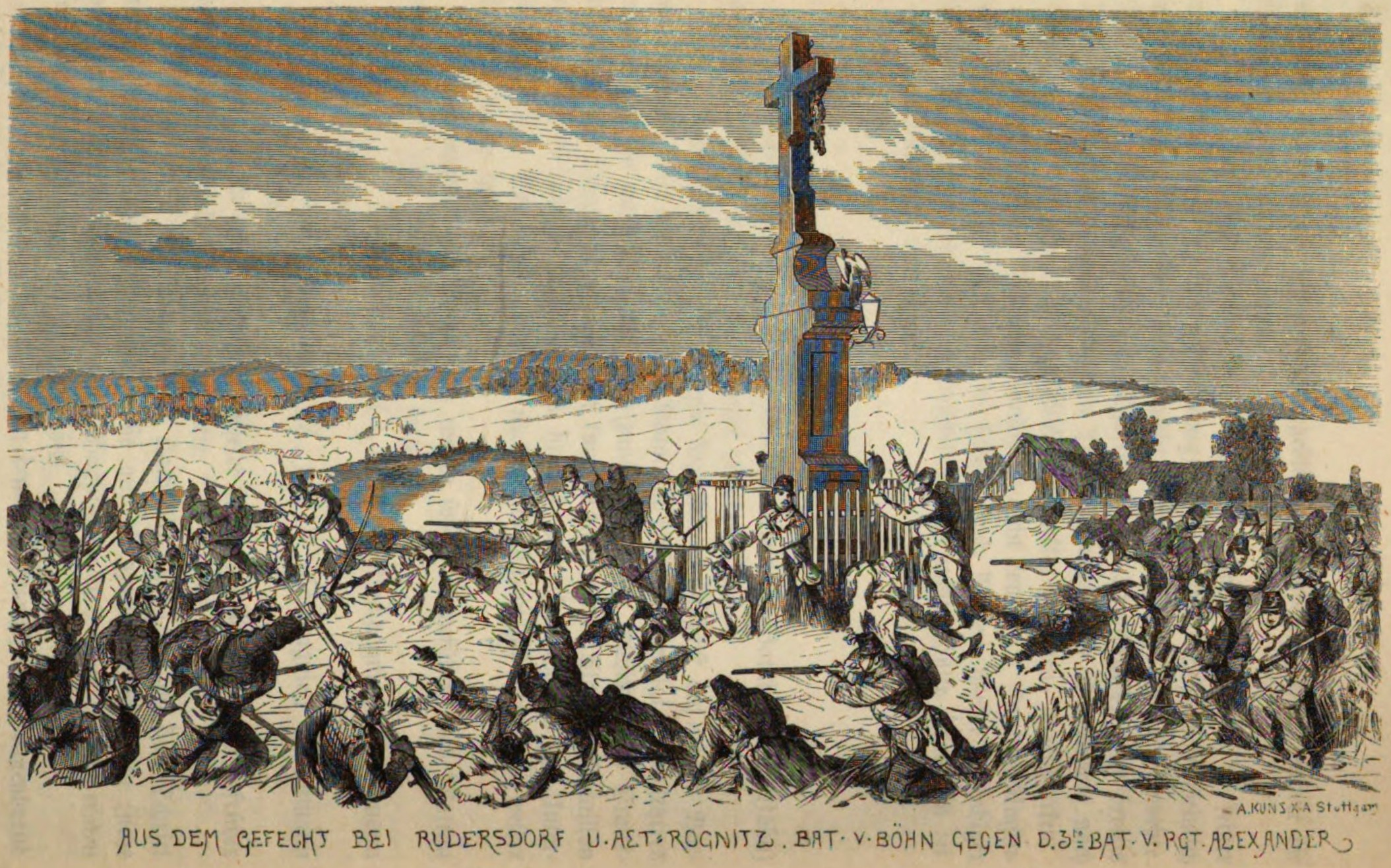
From the skirmish by Rudersdorf and Alt-Rognitz, 28 June 1866 (L. Burger, 1871)

Having been ordered by Glabenz to march towards Radec and not knowing the outcome of the fighting at Burkersdorf (Střítež), Colonel Grivicic at 12:00 AM reached the hamlet of Rudersdorf (today Rubínovice within Trutnov-Starý Rokytník), where he stood poised between the 1st and 2nd Prussian Guard divisions. At Rudersdorf Grivicic encountered a Prussian battalion which had been detached as flank protection. Assuming he was faced by an entire division, Grivicic took up a defensive position against the Prussian battalion. By 1:00 PM, having understood his mistake, Grivicic restarted a cautious advance against the Prussian line, which had been reinforced by a second battalion and later by the 4th Guards Brigade. Failing to make headway against the Dreyse needle gun, Grivicic halted the advance and then retreated towards the town, which was then fought over house-to-house. As three new Prussian Guard battalions appeared and turned his right flank, making the brigade collapse and disperse. In all, Grivicic brigade lost 2512 men and was effectively destroyed.

== Archaeology ==
In 2025, during construction of the D11 motorway, archaeologists discovered three mass graves from the Battle of Burkersdorf. Two of the graves, near Střítež, were Prussian. These graves had ten soldiers total, and also parts of uniforms, weapons, and a pocket coffee grinder. The other grave, near Studenec, was Austrian. It had 23 soldiers, and also parts of uniforms, weapons, and a silver pocket watch. There was a saber scabbard fitting in this grave, suggesting that one of the dead was a non-commissioned officer.

== Literature ==
- Geoffrey Wawro: The Austro-Prussian War: Austria’s War with Prussia and Italy in 1866, Cambridge University Press, Cambridge, UK, 1997
