= Ludwig von Gablenz =

Austrian general (1814–1874)

Ludwig Karl Wilhelm Freiherr von Gablenz
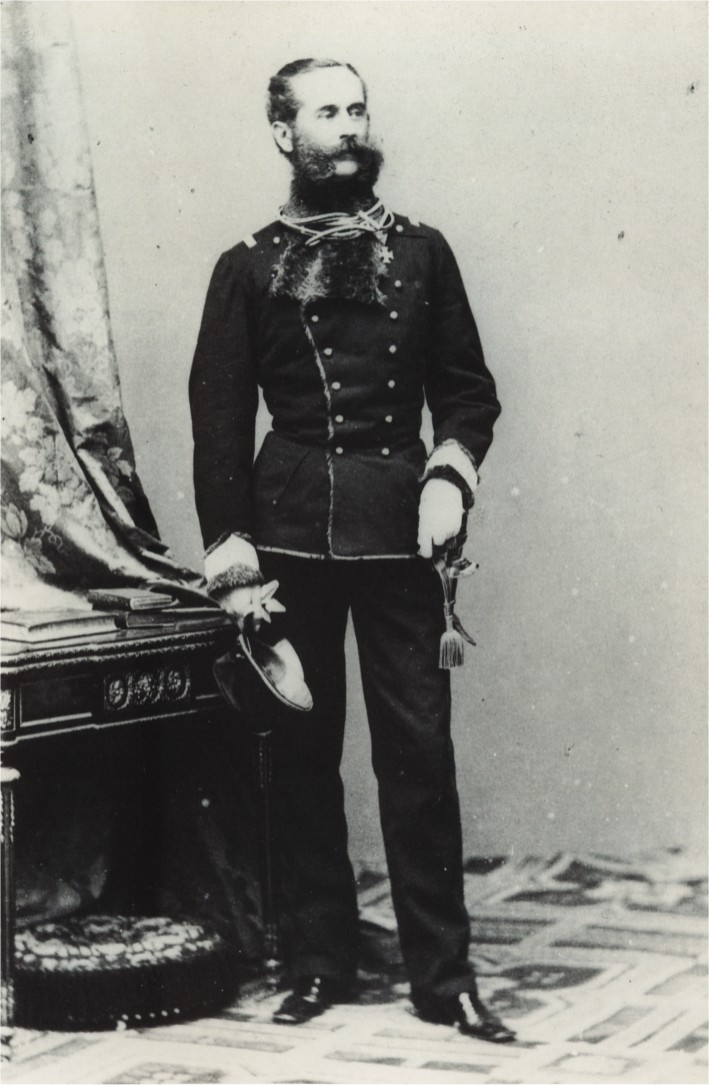
- Born: 19 July 1814; Jena
- Died: 23 January 1874 (aged 59); Zürich
- Military career
- Allegiance: Austrian Empire; Austria-Hungary
- Branch: Imperial Austrian Army; Austro-Hungarian Army
- Service years: 1831–1833 (Saxony); 1833–1874 (Austrian Empire)
- Rank: General der Kavallerie
- Commands: VI Corps; V Corps; X Corps
- Conflicts: First Italian Independence War; Hungarian Revolution of 1848; Second Italian War of Independence; Battle of Magenta; Battle of Solferino; Second Schleswig War; Battle for Königshügel; Battle of Sankelmark; Battle of Vejle; Evacuation of Fredericia; Battle of Dybbøl; Austro-Prussian War; Battle of Trautenau; Battle of Burkersdorf; Battle of Königgrätz
- Awards: Military Order of Maria Theresa

Ludwig Karl Wilhelm Freiherr von Gablenz (Note: later referred to as von Gablenz-Eskeles from 1873) (19 July 1814 – 28 January 1874) was an Austrian general of Saxon origin.

== Early life ==
Born in Jena in 1814 to a Saxon noble family, Gablenz entered the Saxon Army at the age of 17. In 1833 he transferred to the Austrian service. Gablenz fought in the First Italian War of Independence. Promoted to major in the General-Staff-Corps, he was transferred to Hungary to combat the Hungarian Revolution and was posted to the staff of Field Marshal Alfred I, Prince of Windisch-Grätz and then as the chief of staff to General der Kavallerie Franz Schlik's army corps. For his services in Hungary, Gablenz was promoted to colonel in December 1849.

== General officer ==
Gablenz was made Generalmajor in May 1854 and was given command of a brigade in the occupation corps of the Danube principalities. In 1857 he was given an infantry brigade in Feldmarschalleutnant Friedrich Zobel's VII Corps. Ennobled as an Austrian baron in March 1858, Gablenz served in the Second Italian War of Independence, where he fought at Magenta and Solferino. Transferred to the V Corps, Gablenz was promoted to Feldmarschalleutnant in 1862.

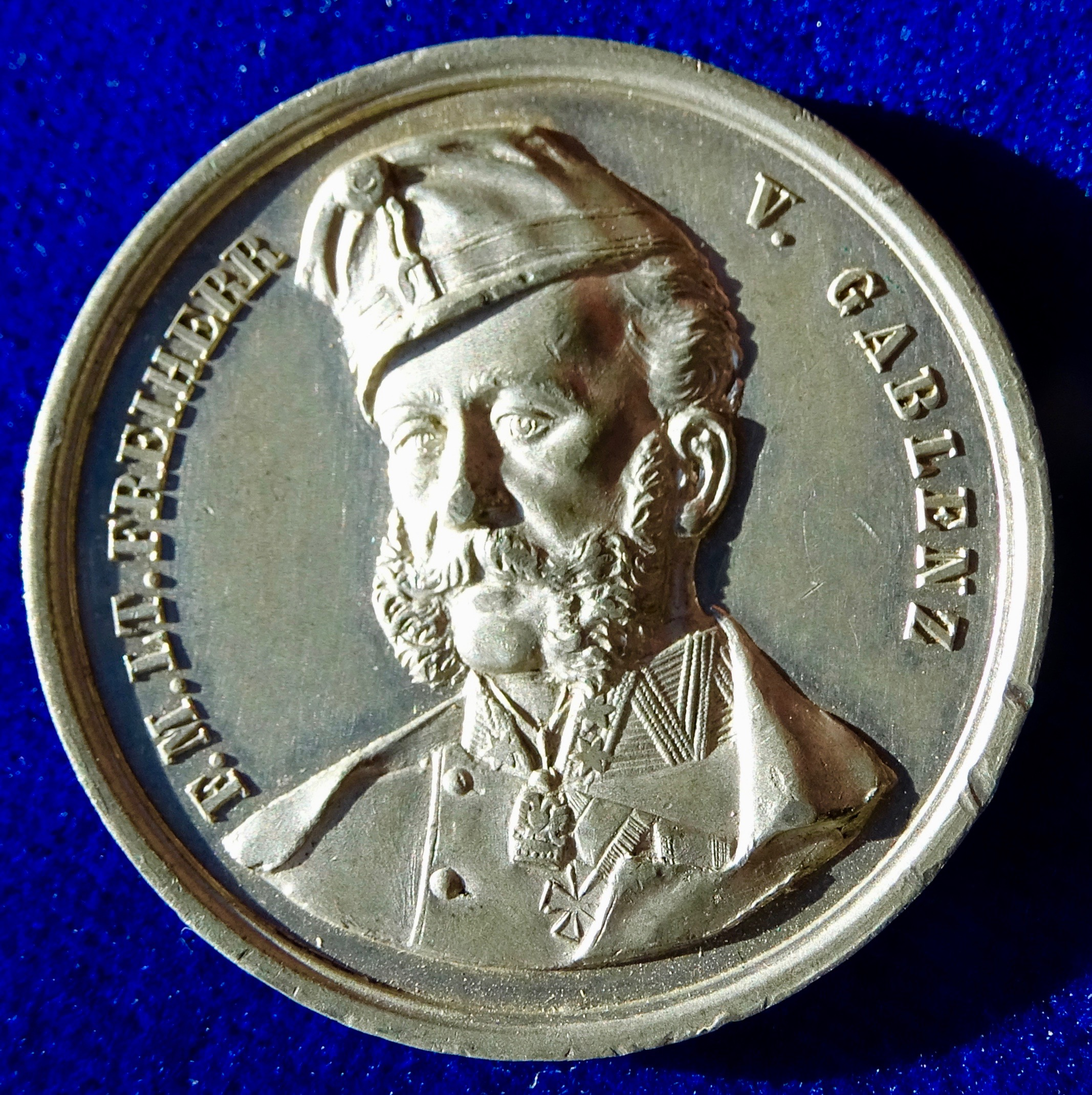
Austrian Medal 1864 (ND), Gablenz's return to Vienna after the Second Schleswig War, obverse.

In December 1863, Gablenz was appointed to command of the VI Corps, with which he served in the Second Schleswig War, where he particularly distinguished himself at Oeversee and Düppel. For his success in Schleswig-Holstein, Gablenz was awarded the Commander's Cross of the Military Order of Maria Theresa, Austria's highest military honour. Appointed a Privy Councilor in November 1864, he became the commanding general of the V Corps and was named governor of the Duchy of Holstein, a position he held until the outbreak of the Austro-Prussian War.

At the start of the Austro-Prussian War, which mostly took place in Eastern Bohemia (Czech Republic), Gablenz was considered to be one Austria's foremost generals. During the war, Gablenz commanded the X Corps in Feldzeugmeister Ludwig von Benedek’s Northern Army. Although victorious against Adolf von Bonin's I Corps at Trautenau (Trutnov, 27 June 1866) in the only Austrian victory against the Prussians, Gablenz's position became untenable due to the Austrian loss at Náchod and the Prussian Guard Corps' advance towards Eipel (Úpice), and he was ordered to retreat towards Deutsch Prausnitz (Německá Brusnice) to block the Prussian Guards. The next day, at the Battle of Burkersdorf, Gablenz managed to extricate his corps though with heavy casualties. After reuniting with the main army, Gablenz and the X Corps fought at the Battle of Königgrätz (Hradec Králové).

After the war, Gablenz became commanding general in Croatia and Slavonia (June 1867). In April 1868, he was promoted to General der Kavallerie and made the commanding general in Hungary in July 1869.

Following the stock market crash of 1873 Gablenz was plagued by debt and fearing the loss of Emperor Franz Joseph's confidence he committed suicide in Zürich on 28 January 1874. He was first buried at the Zurich municipal cemetery, but in 1905 his remains were transferred into the newly completed crypt of the warrior monument built in 1868 to commemorate the Battle of Trautenau. Gablenz's former tombstone of the Zurich municipal cemetery was also taken to Trautenau and it is situated opposite the monument.
