= Alexander August Wilhelm von Pape =

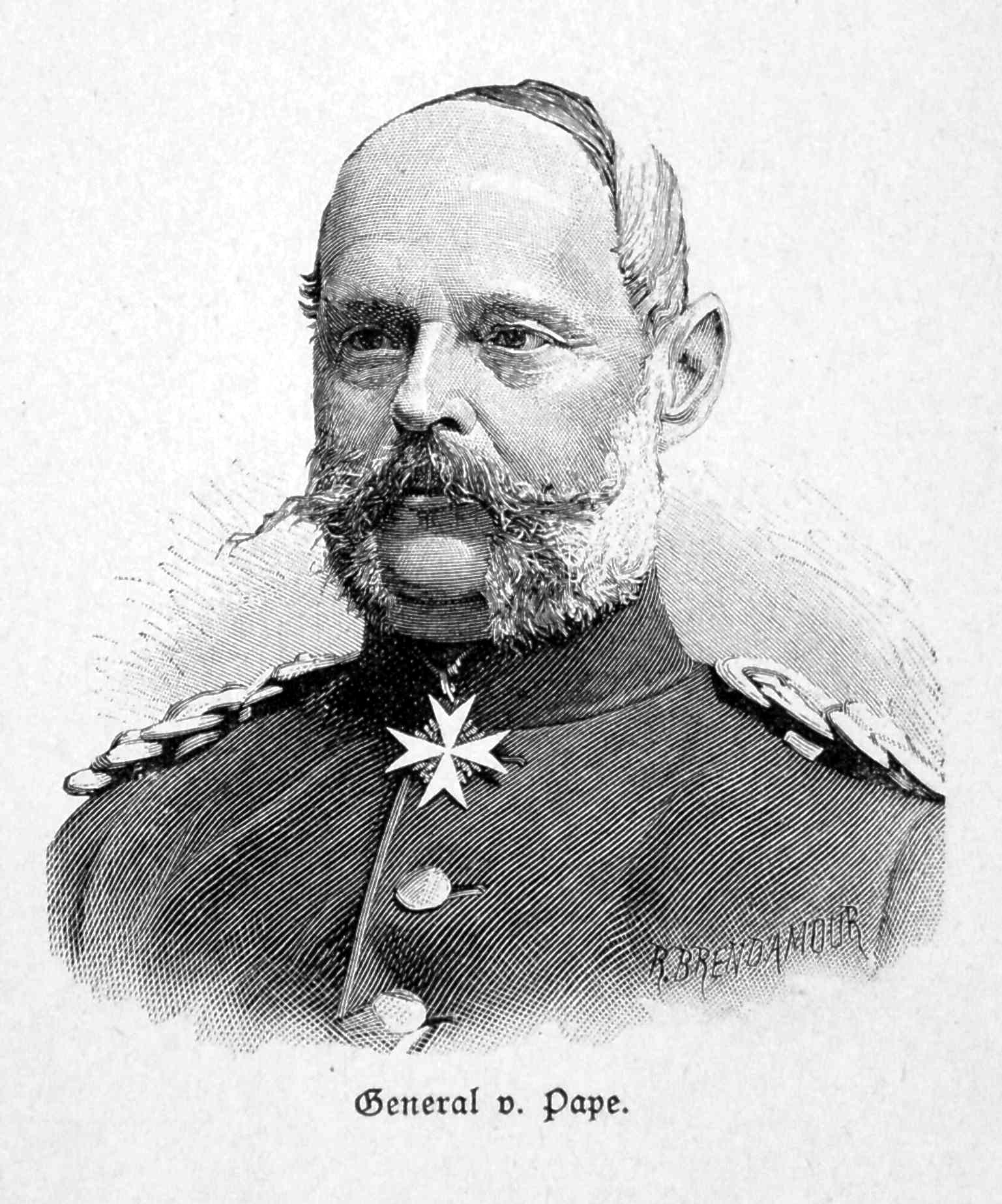
- Alexander August Wilhelm von Pape
- Born: 2 February 1813; Berlin
- Died: 7 May 1895 (aged 82); Berlin
- Military career
- Allegiance: Prussia
- Service years: 1830–1895
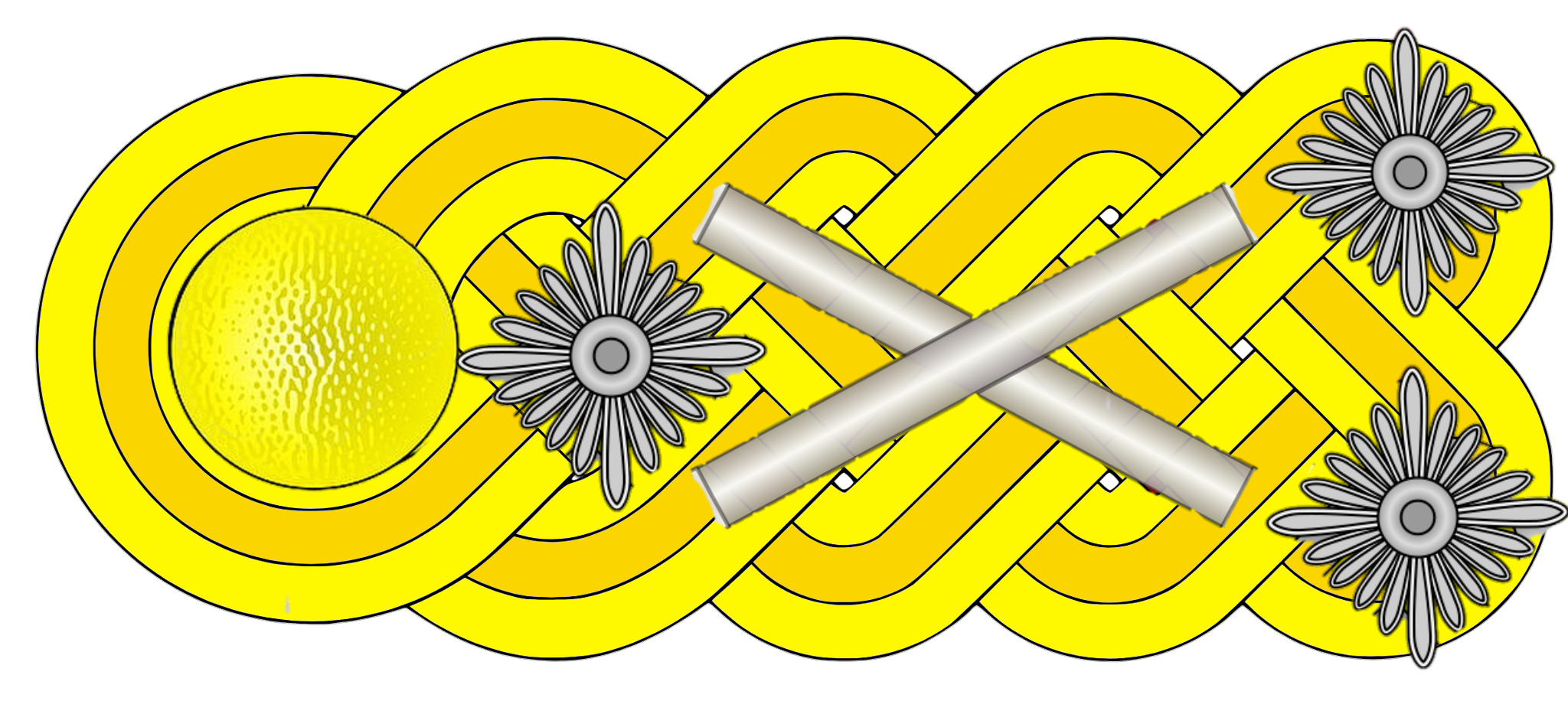
- Rank: Generaloberst mit dem Range als GFM
- Conflicts: Austro-Prussian War; Franco-Prussian War
- Awards: Pour le Mérite; Iron Cross; Military Merit Order (Bavaria); Military Order of St. Henry; Order of St. George (Russia)

Alexander August Wilhelm von Pape (2 February 1813 – 7 May 1895) was a Royal Prussian infantry Colonel-General with the special rank of Generalfeldmarschall.

== Biography ==
Pape was born in Berlin. He started his military career in 1830 as Fahnenjunker of the 2nd Guards Infantry Regiment. In 1856, as a Major, he was appointed to head the cadet school in Potsdam, and in 1860 he became a battalion commander.

In the Austro-Prussian War of 1866, Pape was a Colonel commanding the 2nd Guards Infantry Regiment, which he had led since 1863, and then the 2nd Guards Infantry Brigade. On 17 September 1866, Pape was awarded the Pour le Mérite for his services during the war. On 31 December 1866 he was promoted to Generalmajor. On the outbreak of the Franco-Prussian War of 1870/71, he was given command of the 1st Guards Infantry Division which took St.-Privat-la-Montagne on 18 August, then successfully fought in the Battle of Sedan, leading to the Siege of Paris and the final victory.

In 1880 Pape was promoted to General of the Infantry and given command of the V Corps. In 1881 he led the III Corps and in 1884 he was appointed to the lead of the Guards Corps. In September 1888, Pape was relieved of this position and promoted to the rank of Colonel General with the rank of Field Marshal. He held the position of Governor of Berlin and was in charge of the military within the Province of Brandenburg. By 1885 he was a member of the Landesverteidigungskommission.

Pape retired in January 1895. He died shortly thereafter on 7 May in his hometown of Berlin. Pape was highly respected to that by Emperor William, who called him "The role model of a traditional Prussian military leader".

The street "General-Pape-Straße" in Tempelhof was named in honor of Pape by a decree of the emperor. A train station of the Berlin S-Bahn was named "Station Papestraße" until 27 May 2006, when it was renamed Berlin Südkreuz to match with similar names like Ostkreuz and Westkreuz.

== Honours ==
He received the following orders and decorations:

- Kingdom of Prussia:
  - Pour le Mérite (military), 17 September 1866; with Oak Leaves, 22 March 1872
  - Knight of the Red Eagle, 2nd Class with Star, Oak Leaves and Swords, 1871; Grand Cross with Swords on Ring, 15 April 1880
  - Knight of the Black Eagle, 22 March 1886; with Collar, 1887; with Diamonds, 3 September 1891
  - Grand Commander's Cross of the Royal House Order of Hohenzollern, with Star, 17 April 1890
  - Iron Cross (1870), 1st Class
- Hohenzollern: Cross of Honour of the Princely House Order of Hohenzollern, 1st Class
- (Austrian Empire) (Kingdom of Hungary) Austria-Hungary:
  - Knight of the Iron Crown, 1st Class, 1872
  - Grand Cross of the Imperial Order of Leopold, 1882
- Kingdom of Bavaria: Grand Cross of the Military Merit Order
- Denmark: Knight of the Elephant, 25 August 1888
- Kingdom of Italy: Grand Cross of Saints Maurice and Lazarus
- Empire of Japan: Grand Cordon of the Rising Sun
- Mecklenburg:
  - Grand Cross of the Wendish Crown, with Crown in Ore
  - Military Merit Cross, 1st Class (Schwerin)
- Netherlands: Commander of the Military William Order, 26 August 1878
- Persian Empire: Order of the Lion and the Sun, 1st Class
- Kingdom of Portugal: Grand Cross of the Royal Military Order of St. Benedict of Aviz
- Kingdom of Romania: Grand Cross of the Star of Romania
- Russian Empire:
  - Knight of St. George, 4th Class, 27 December 1870
  - Knight of the White Eagle
  - Knight of St. Vladimir, 2nd Class with Swords on Ring
- Saxe-Weimar-Eisenach: Grand Cross of the White Falcon
- Kingdom of Saxony:
  - Commander of the Military Order of St. Henry, 2nd Class, 1870
  - Grand Cross of the Albert Order
- Sweden-Norway:
  - Commander Grand Cross of the Sword, 3 September 1867
  - Knight of the Seraphim, 31 August 1888
- Württemberg: Grand Cross of the Württemberg Crown, 1882

== Literature ==
- Kurt von Priesdorff: Soldatisches Führertum. Band 8, Hanseatische Verlagsanstalt Hamburg, ohne Jahr, pp. 258–266.
- Bernhard von Poten: Pape, Alexander von. In: Allgemeine Deutsche Biographie (ADB). Band 52, Duncker & Humblot, Leipzig 1906, p. 749 f.
