= Ludwig Burger =

German painter

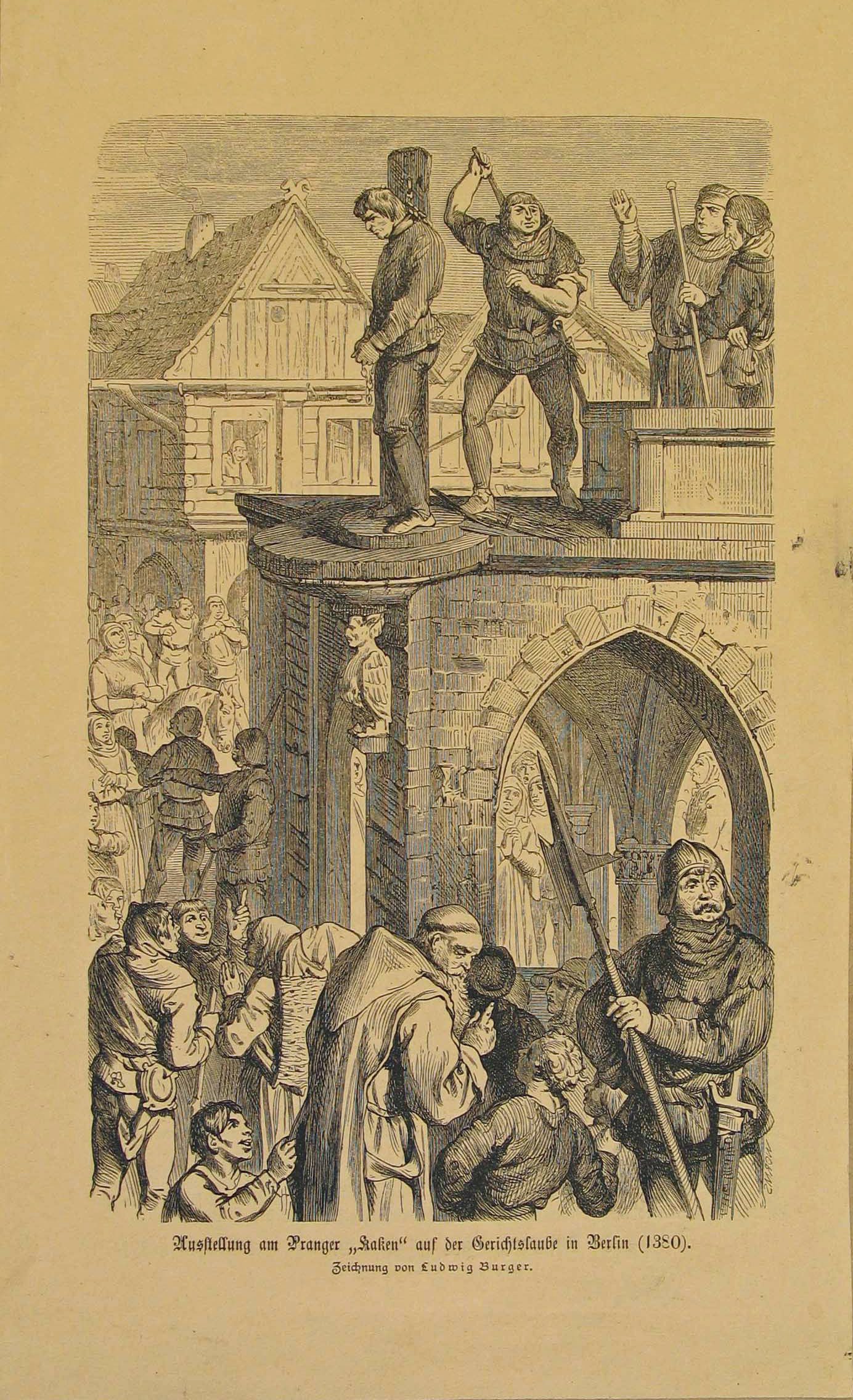
Drawing by Ludwig Burger from around 1880: "Ausstellung am Pranger 'Kaken' auf der Gerichtslaube in Berlin (1380)”

Ludwig Burger (19 September 1825 – 22 October 1884) was a German historical painter, illustrator and medalist.

== Biography ==
Burger was born on 19 September 1825 in Kraków. He studied at the Berlin Art Academy, at the same time working at book illustrating; he was also a pupil of Thomas Couture in Paris. Among his best drawings are the illustrations for the works of La Fontaine and a collection of 20 plates known as Die Kanone. After 1869, he devoted himself to decorative painting, his most important work in this line being the walls and ceilings in the Berlin City Hall (1870) and the colossal figures symbolizing the warlike virtues at the School of Cadets at Lichterfelde (1878).

He died on 22 October 1884 in Berlin.

== See also ==
- List of German painters
