= Guards Fusilier Regiment =

- Active: 30 March 1826 - 14 December 1918
- Country: Prussia
- Allegiance: Prussian Army
- Type: Guards regiment
- Role: Infantry
- Part of: Guard Corps
- Nickname: Maykäfer
- Mottos: Es lebe hoch das Regiment, welches sich mit Stolz Maykäfer nennt!
- Colors: Blue coat, red collars, red Swedish sleeve markings, white lace, yellow epaulettes, silver Guards eagle

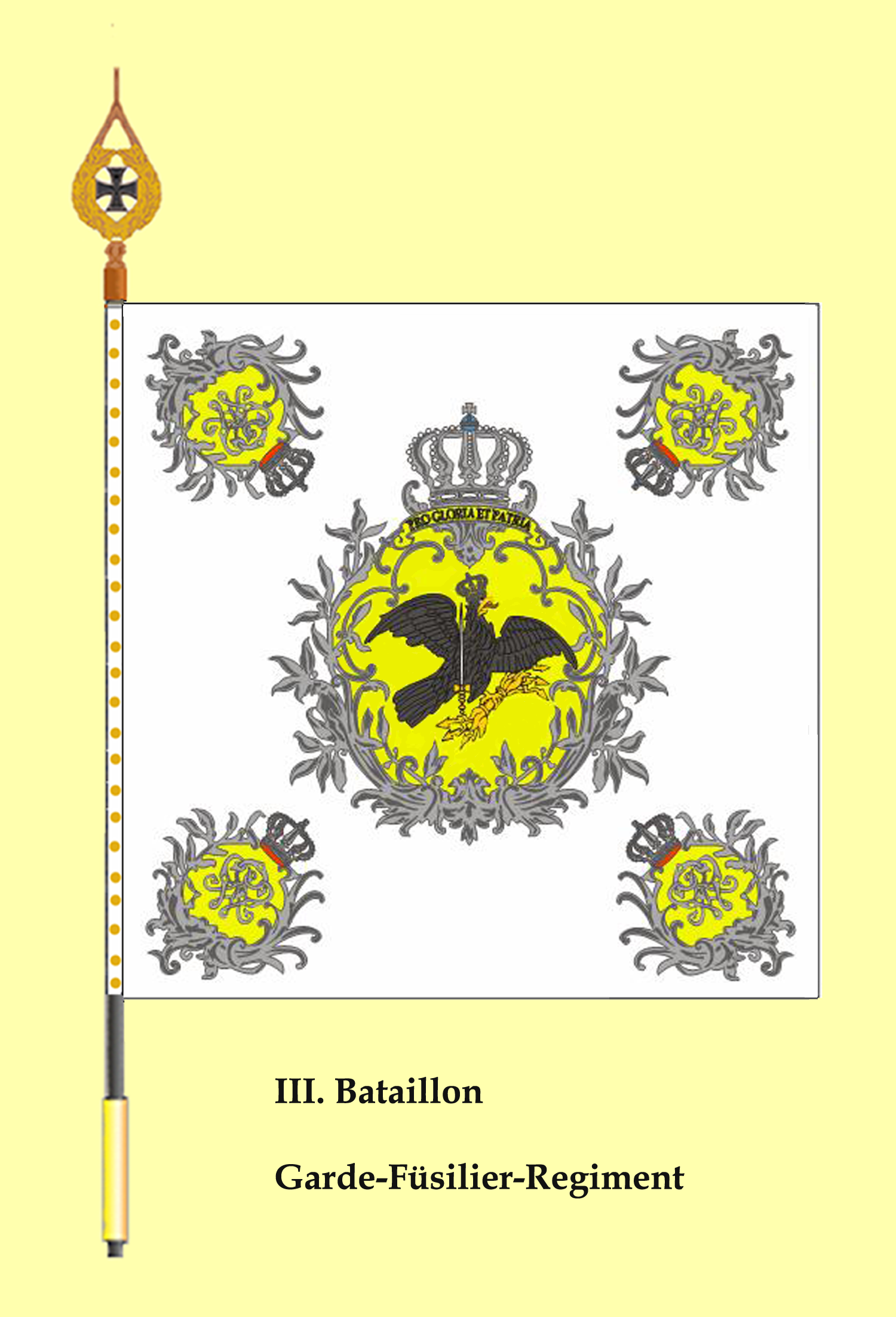
Flag of the III battalion

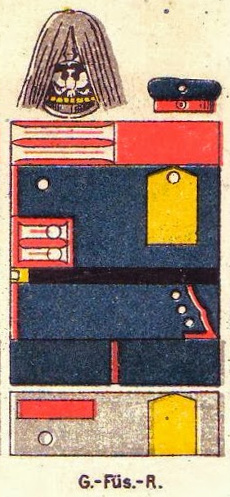
Uniform Details of The Regiment

The Guards Fusilier Regiment (German: Garde-Füsilier-Regiment) or Guards Fusiliers was an infantry unit of the Guards Corps of the Prussian Army garrisoned in Berlin. In keeping with the genteel nature of the unit, most of its officer corps were nobility. At the time of the German Empire it commanded soldiers guarding the Wache.

== History ==
In 1826 the Guards Reserve Infantry (Landwehr) Regiment (Garde-Reserve-Infanterie (Landwehr) Regiment) was founded. In 1851 it was renamed the Guards Reserve Infantry Regiment (Garde-Reserve-Infanterie-Regiment) and, as part of the 1860 expansion of the army under Roonsch, given the name of Guards Fusilier Regiment (Garde-Füsilier-Regiment). The regimental staff and the Ist Battalion were initially based in Potsdam, whilst the IInd Battalion were stationed in Spandau. From 1851 to 1918 the whole regiment was moved to a garrison in Maykäfer Barracks in Berlin.

=== Austro-Prussian War ===
In 1866 it fought in the Austro-Prussian War at the Battle of Königinhof and Battle of Königgrätz.

=== Franco-Prussian War ===
In the 1870/71 war against France the regiment participated at Gravelotte and Sedan as well as the Siege of Paris.

=== First World War ===
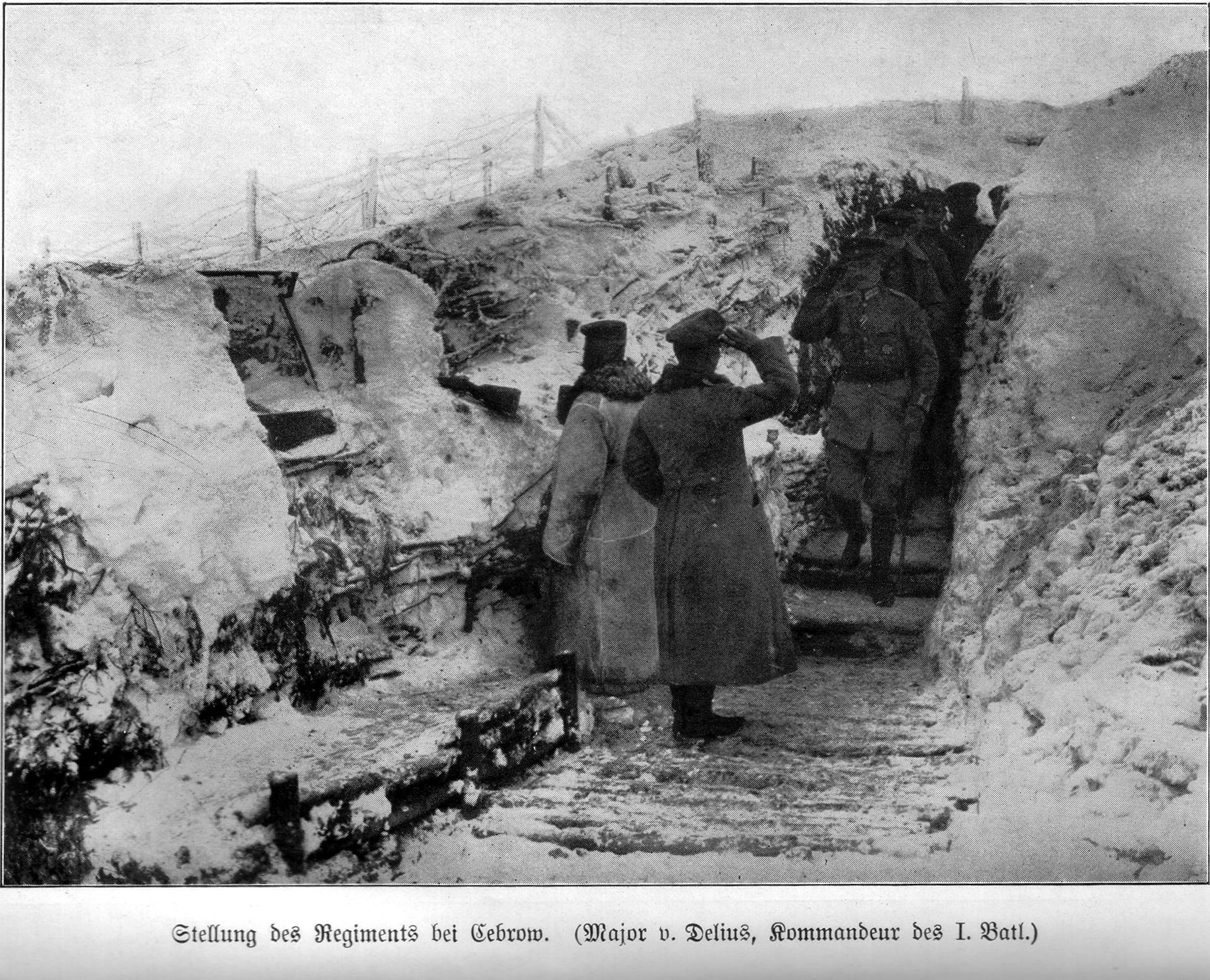
The regiment in its position before the storming of Zwinin in February or March 1915

At the onset of the First World War the regiment was mobilised and was assigned to the newly formed 6th Guards Infantry Brigade of the 3rd Guards Division. The unit remained in this formation for the course of the war. Initially the fusiliers took part in the invasion of neutral Belgium and were involved in the capture of Namur. They were then deployed to the Eastern Front and fought there in the Battle of the Masurian Lakes. After suffering heavy losses at Brzeziny the remaining members of the regiment had to be gathered into a battalion. On 1 December the unit was regrouped into 2 battalions of 3 companies each. From 22 December the battalions were reorganised into four companies each. In January 1915 the IIIrd Battalion was reformed and the regiment redeployed at the end of that month to the Carpathians. They took part in the months that followed in trench warfare at Zwinin, the ridge finally being taken in April. After further fighting on the Eastern Front the regiment was sent to the West in April 1916, taking part in trench warfare in the Champagne and on the Yser, and participating in the Battle of the Somme. From September to November 1916 it deployed again briefly to the Eastern Front before returning to the West and engaging in trench warfare in Lorraine (region). Here, in December 1916, the regiment was reinforced by a 2nd and 3rd MG company. 1917 saw the unit engaged during the battles of Arras, Passchendaele and Cambrai. At the start of the 1918 German Spring Offensive the fusiliers suffered heavy casualties at Beaumetz and subsequently formed itself into 2 battalions of 3 companies each. On 5 April the regiment was reorganised into 3 battalions again and joined on 14 September 1918 by a MW company.

=== Post-War ===
Following the end of the war the regiment was demobilised on 14 December 1918 in Berlin and finally disbanded. Elements of it were used to form two Freikorps units that were later incorporated into the Provisional Reichswehr.

The regiment's tradition was transferred in the Reichswehr by a directive of the Chief of the General Staff (Chef der Heeresleitung), General of Infantry Hans von Seeckt, dated 24 August 1921, to the 7th and 8th companies of the 5th (Prussian) Infantry.

== Commanders ==
Rank	Name	Date
Lieutenant colonel/ Colonel	Karl August von Esebeck	1826 to 29 March 1829
Lieutenant colonel	Ernst Ludwig Otto von Zieten	30 March 1829 to 29 March 1832
Lieutenant colonel/ Colonel	Alexander von Knobelsdorff	30 March 1832 to 29 March 1838
Lieutenant colonel/ Colonel	August Alexander von Zenge	30 March 1838 to 1841
Lieutenant colonel	Wilhelm von Doering	14 December 1841 to 25 April 1842 (appointed to command)
Lieutenant colonel/ Colonel	Wilhelm von Doering	26 April 1842 to 12 July 1848
Lieutenant colonel/ Colonel	Eduard von Schlichting	13 July 1848 to 31 May 1850
Lieutenant colonel/ Colonel	Gustav von der Schulenburg-Altenhausen	3 October 1850 to 9 May 1855
Lieutenant colonel/ Colonel	Eugen von Le Blanc Souville	10 May 1855 to 21 May 1858
Lieutenant colonel	Ludwig von Loewenfeld	22 May 1858 14 April 1859
Lieutenant colonel/ Colonel	Ludwig von Loewenfeld	15 April 1859 to 6 March 1863
Lieutenant colonel/ Colonel	Hugo von Obernitz	7 March 1863 to 19 May 1866
Lieutenant colonel/ Colonel	Bernhard Franz Wilhelm von Werder	20 May to 16 September 1866 (appointed to command)
Colonel	Bernhard Franz Wilhelm von Werder	17 September 1866 to 6 November 1869
Lieutenant colonel/ Colonel	Viktor von Erckert	7 November 1869 to 18 August 1870
Lieutenant colonel/ Colonel	Otto Friedrich Wilhelm von Papstein	21 August 1870 to 12 March 1875
Colonel	Heinrich Wilhelm von Sannow	13 March 1875 to 17 January 1878
Colonel	Arthur von Lattre	18 January 1878 to 11 April 1881
Lieutenant colonel	Hermann von Stülpnagel	12 April 1881 to 12 November 1882 (appointed to command)
Colonel	Hermann von Stülpnagel	13 November 1882 to 25 May 1887
Colonel	Hermann Blecken von Schmeling	26 May 1887 to 21 March 1889
	Adolf von Keller	22 March 1889 to 27 July 1892
Lieutenant colonel/ Colonel	Max von Krosigk	28 July 1892 to 29 May 1896
Colonel	Remus von Woyrsch	30 May 1896 to 31 August 1897
Colonel	Dietrich von Hülsen-Haeseler	1 September 1897 to 24 March 1899
Lieutenant colonel/ Colonel	Kurt Heinrich Wilhelm von Knobelsdorff	25 March 1899 to 1901
Colonel	Hoyer von Rotenheim	1901 to 30 May 1904
Colonel	Magnus von Eberhardt	31 May 1904 to 4 April 1907
Lieutenant colonel/ Colonel	von Bonin	5 April 1907 to 1911
Lieutenant colonel/ Colonel	von Hammerstein-Equord	1911 to 2 January 1913
Lieutenant colonel/ Colonel	Ernst Armin von Nostitz	3 January 1913 to 1914
Lieutenant colonel/ Colonel	Karl von der Schulenburg-Wolfsburg	30 September 1914 to 21 February 1918
	N.N.	

== See also ==
- List of Imperial German infantry regiments

== Literature ==
- von der Mülbe: Das Garde-Füsilier-Regiment. Zweite Auflage. Verlag R. Eisenschmidt. Berlin 1901.
- Carl H. von der Schulenburg-Wolfsburg: Geschichte des Garde-Füsilier-Regiments. Erinnerungsblätter deutscher Regimenter (preuß. Anteil, Band 157). Oldenburg. Stalling. 1926.
