= Dolní Brusnice =

- Municipality
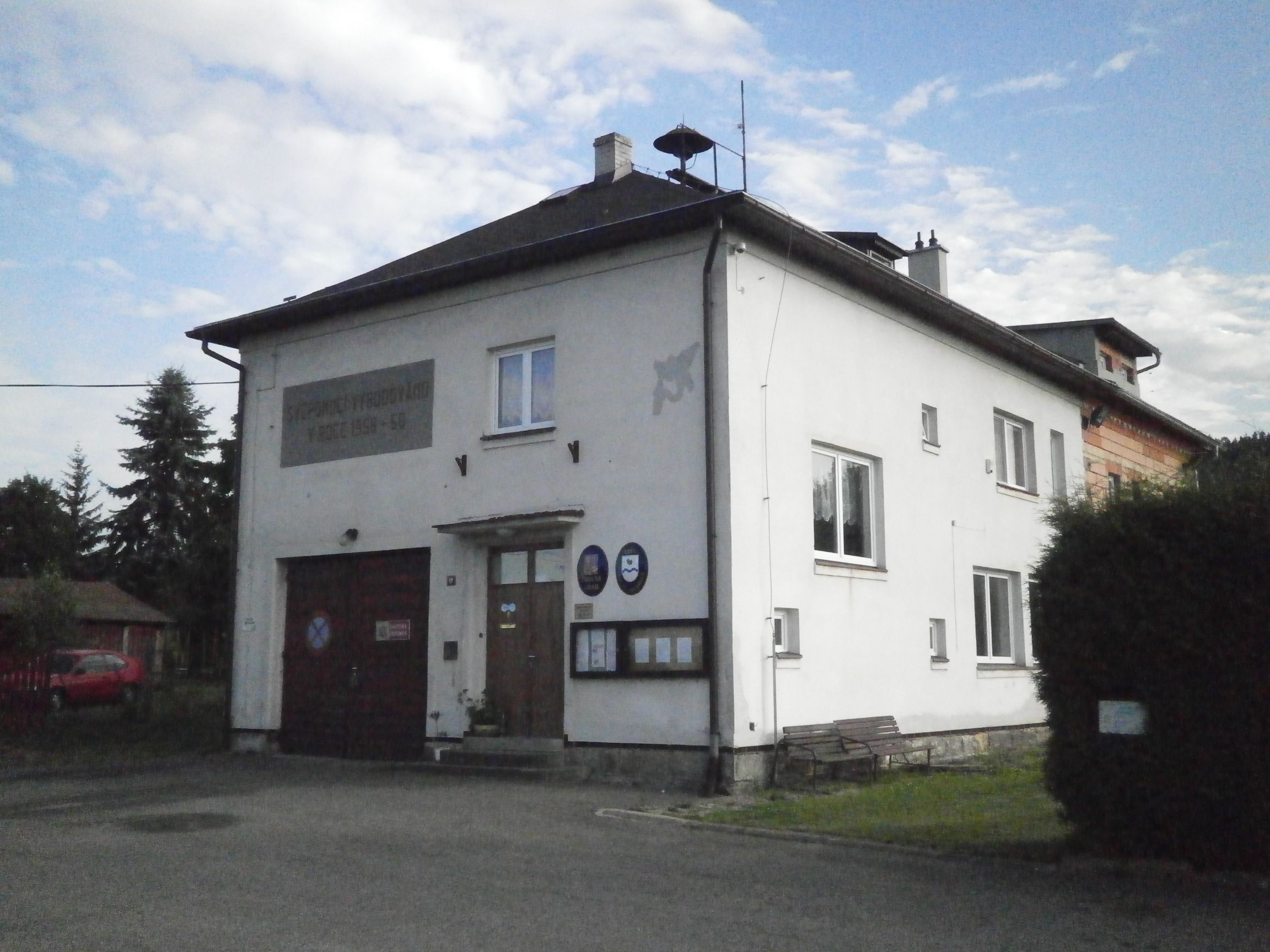
- Municipal office

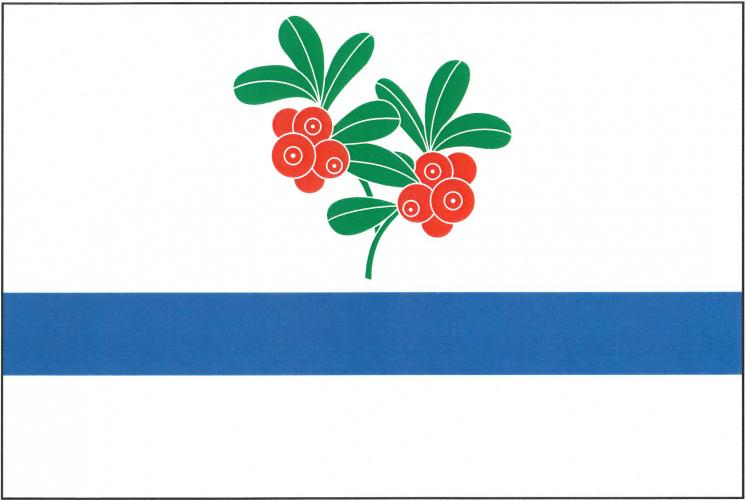
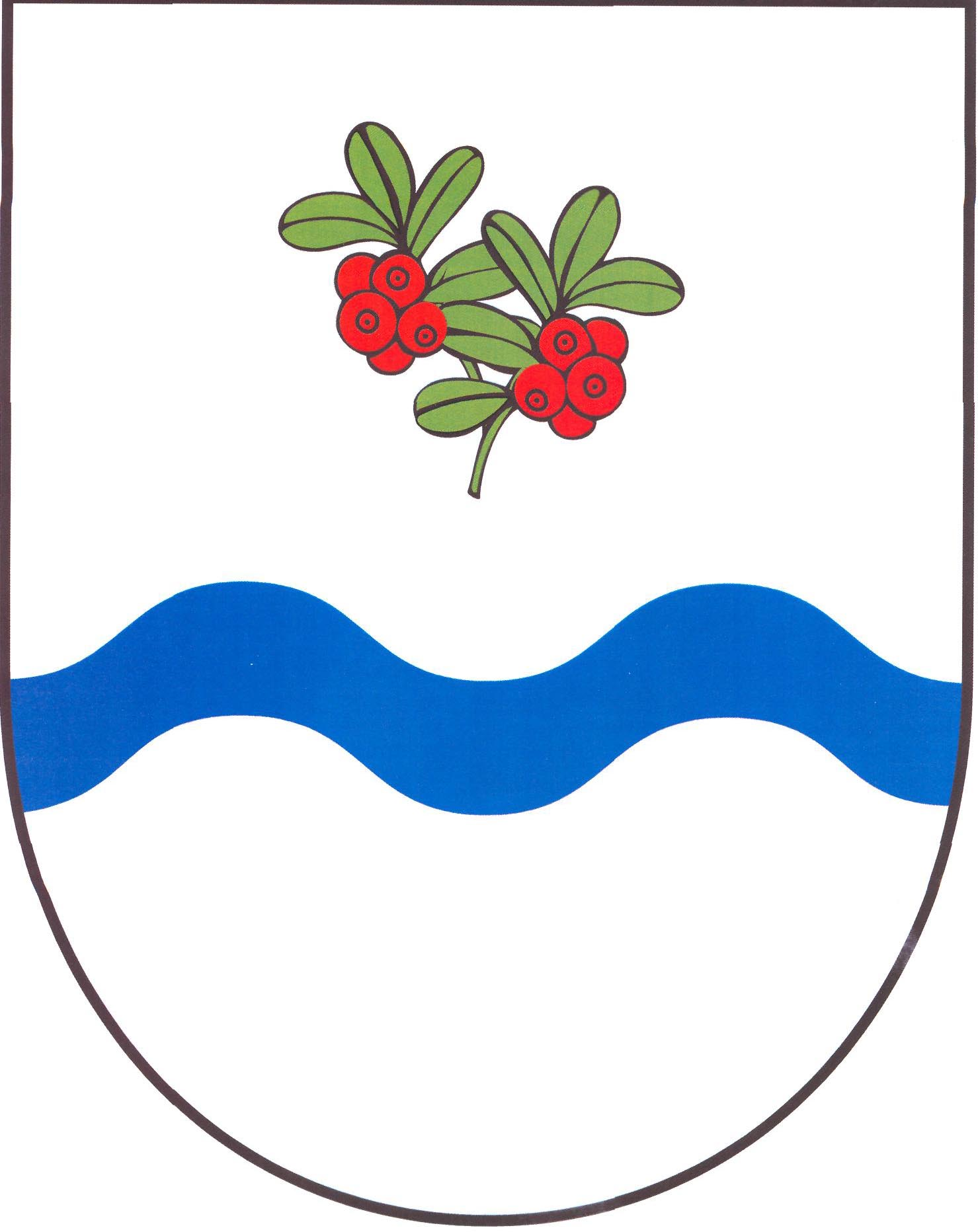
- Flag Coat of arms

- Location in the Czech Republic
- Coordinates: 50°27′32″N 15°43′37″E
- Country: Czech Republic
- Region: Hradec Králové
- District: Trutnov
- First mentioned: 1358

Area
  - Total: 3.86 km^{2} (1.49 sq mi)
- Elevation: 361 m (1,184 ft)

Population (2026-01-01)
  - Total: 377
  - Density: 97.7/km^{2} (253/sq mi)
- Time zone: UTC+1 (CET)
  - Summer (DST): UTC+2 (CEST)
- Postal code: 544 72
- Website: www.dolnibrusnice.cz

Dolní Brusnice is a municipality and village in Trutnov District in the Hradec Králové Region of the Czech Republic. It has about 400 inhabitants.

== Demographics ==
Historical population
Year	Pop.	±%
1869	615	—
1880	601	−2.3%
1890	587	−2.3%
1900	524	−10.7%
1910	490	−6.5%
1921	498	+1.6%
1930	492	−1.2%
1950	471	−4.3%
1961	365	−22.5%
1970	362	−0.8%
1980	329	−9.1%
1991	326	−0.9%
2001	319	−2.1%
2011	354	+11.0%
2021	389	+9.9%
Source: Censuses
