= Battle of Trautenau =

1866 battle of the Austro-Prussian War

Coordinates: 50°33′23″N 15°54′55″E

Battle of Trutnov
- Part of Austro-Prussian War
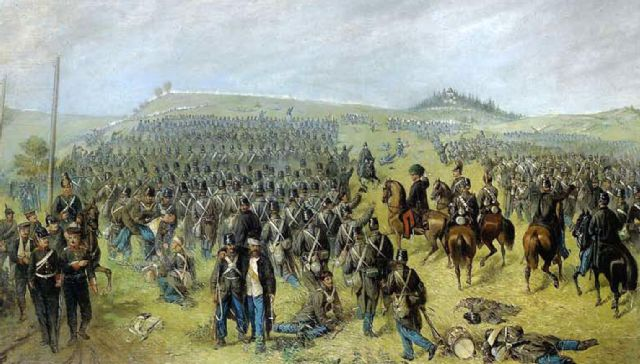
- The Battle of Trautenau by Adolf Zdrazila
Date	27 June 1866
Location	Trutnov, Bohemia, modern day Czech Republic
Result	Austrian victory (see § Outcome)

Belligerents
(Kingdom of Prussia) Prussia	Austrian Empire

Commanders and leaders
Crown Prince Friedrich Wilhelm; Adolf von Bonin	Baron Ludwig von Gablenz

Strength
I Corps, Cav. Reserve	X Corps

Casualties and losses
1,400	5,000

The Battle of Trautenau (German: Schlacht bei Trautenau) or Battle of Trutnov was fought on 27 June 1866, during the Austro-Prussian War. It was the only major battle of the war that ended in an Austrian victory over the Prussians, but at a large cost.

== Background ==
The Prussian Second Army invading Bohemia had to split up in order to negotiate the difficult passes of the Giant Mountains. As they emerged on the Bohemian side, they met Austrian forces. At Nachod the Austrians were soundly beaten, but on the same day, as Adolf von Bonin’s I Corps emerged from the passes it was caught in the open on its way through Trautenau towards Pilníkov, where it hoped to link up with the First Army.

== The battle ==
Bonin's vanguard cleared the passes during the late morning and entered Trautenau at 10:00. The Austrian X Corps, led by Ludwig von Gablenz, had broken camp at 8:00 and marched towards Trautenau to stop Bonin's advance. The Austrian troops arrived piecemeal with the Mondel brigade – which had started its march before the bulk of the Corps – being in position on the heights behind Trautenau at 7:45.

The advance guard of the Prussians was attacked by skirmishing Austrian Jäger when resting in the town square. Mondel, who had been ordered to avoid a general engagement until the whole Corps had assembled, pulled back his troops to the heights. Mondel's rear guard managed to hold up the Prussians until noon. By 12:00 Bonin's 1st division had driven off Mondel and pushed up to the town of Neu-Rognitz (Novy Rokytnik), his 2nd division had taken the heights and was scouting in the direction of the town of Alt-Rognitz (Stary Rokytnik). This gave the Prussians the time to move troops and guns up the commanding heights.

As the Austrian brigades started arriving, Gablenz ordered a second brigade (Wimpffen) to pass Mondel and take the Johannesberg, while a third brigade (Grivicic) was to envelop the Prussian left and storm the Hopfenberg. To prepare the attack, Gablenz ordered a grand battery of 40 guns to open up fire on the Prussian held heights. Upon this heavy bombardment Bonin panicked and started to withdraw back towards the passes. Before this retreat could be enacted, the Austrians attacked in half-battalion masses. The Austrian attacks of Grivicic and Wimpffen were uncoordinated and stalled against the Prussian fire from the Dreyse needle gun. Four Prussian battalions from the rear guard thus managed to hold up the Austrian brigades. By 17:00 Gablenz fourth brigade (Knebel) had arrived and was originally placed in reserve. When he saw Grivicic's and Wimpffen's brigades struggling, Knebel disregarded orders and attacked and took the heights in conjunction with Wimpffen, losing 900 men in the process, to drive off Bonin's rear guard.

== Outcome ==
Although an Austrian victory, the cost had been high, that is why it is described as Pyrrhic. The Austrians lost about 5,000 men to the Prussians' 1,400. Although the Prussian I Corps had been driven back, Gablenz's position had become untenable. To his left Steinmetz's V Corps had broken through at Nachod and to his right the Prussian Guard Corps was nearing Úpice, threatening both his flanks (distance map). The following day Gablenz tried to evade encirclement by the Prussian Guards but he had to sacrifice most of Grivicic's brigade, which was nearly destroyed, at Burkersdorf and Rudersdorf, to enable his retreat.

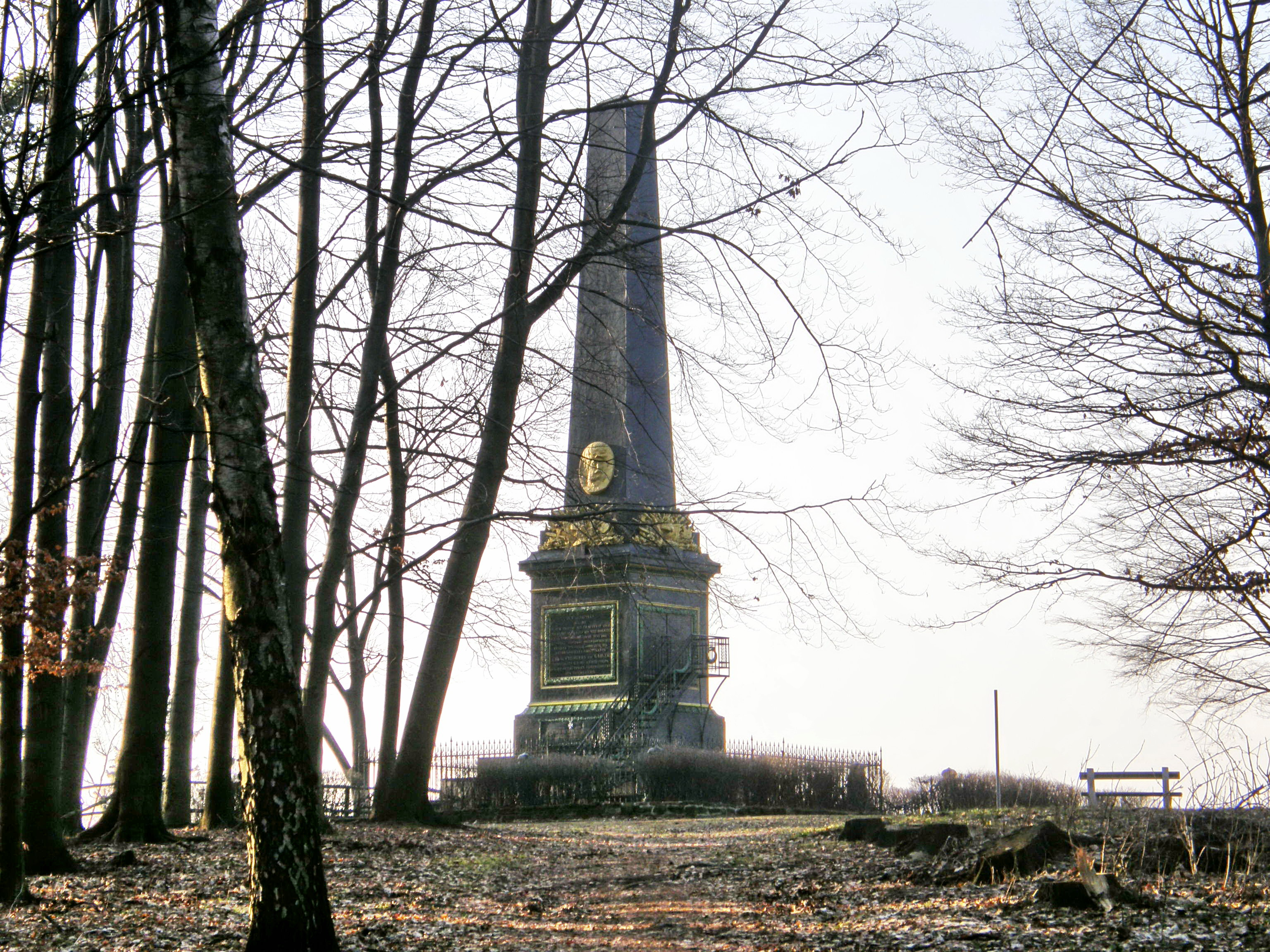
1868 monument

A fifty-ton obelisk was erected in Trautenau in 1868 to commemorate the battle. Attending the monument's opening ceremony was General Gablenz, who had obtained the costly victory at Trautenau and was afterwards blamed for losing the war. Gablenz died in 1874 and was buried beneath the monument.

== Bibliography ==
- Matthias Blazek: Die Schlacht bei Trautenau – Der einzige Sieg Österreichs im Deutschen Krieg 1866. ibidem: Stuttgart 2012 ISBN 978-3-8382-0367-6
- Heinz Helmert and Hans-Jürgen Usczeck: Preußischdeutsche Kriege von 1864 bis 1871 – Militärischer Verlauf. 6th edition, Militärverlag der Deutschen Demokratischen Republik, Berlin 1988, ISBN 3-327-00222-3
- Adolf Strobl: Trautenau – Kurze Darstellung des gleichnamigen Treffens am 27. Juni 1866. Wien 1901
- Matthias Blazek: Die Schlacht bei Trautenau, Sachsenspiegel 52, Cellesche Zeitung, 31 December 2011
