= 2nd Foot Guards (German Empire) =

2nd Foot Guards Regiment
- 2. Garde-Regiment zu Fuß
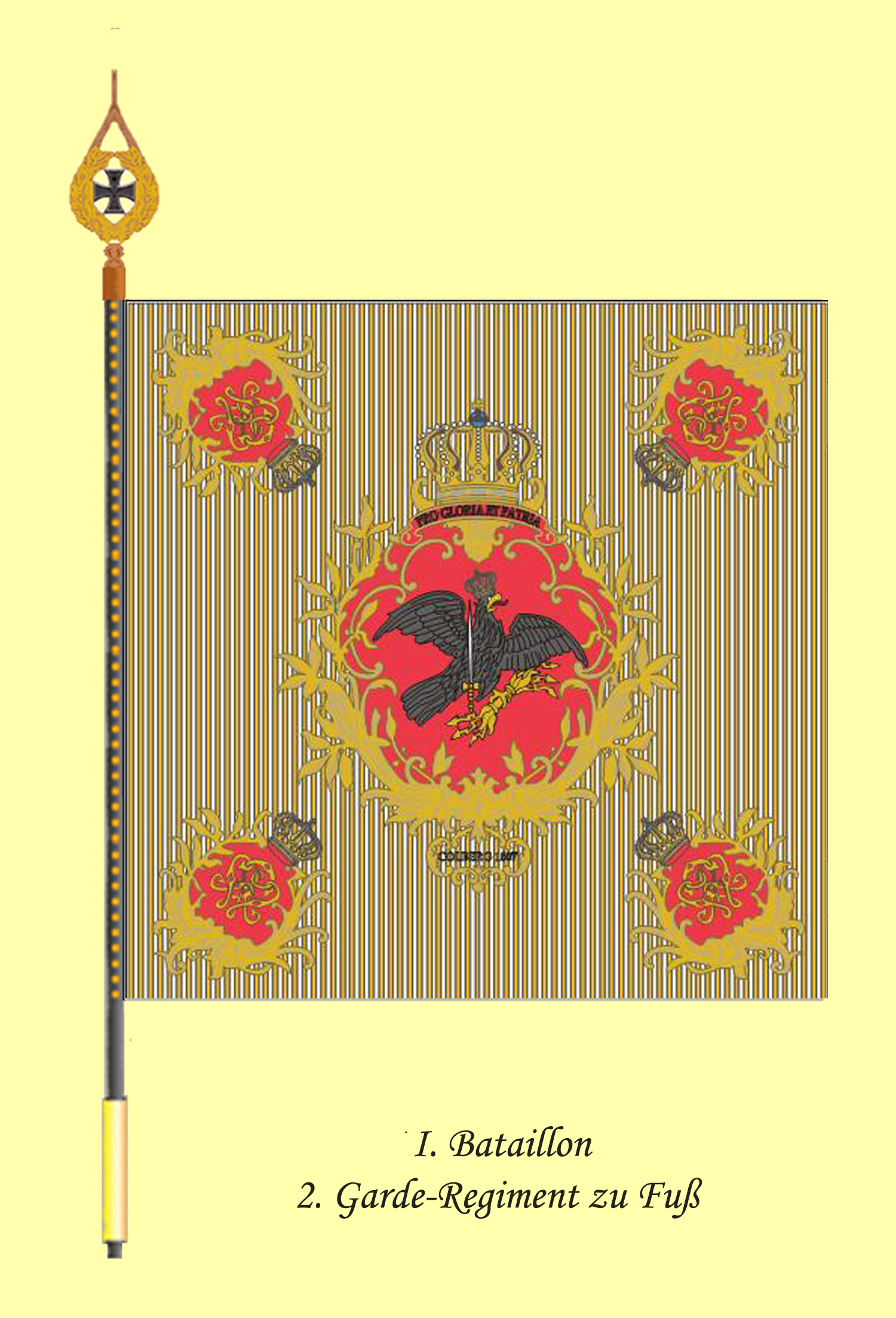
- Colors of the 1st Battalion of the 2nd Foot Guards.
- Active: 1813 – 1919
- Country: Prussia
- Branch: Prussian Army
- Type: Infantry Regiment
- Garrison/HQ: Berlin

Commanders
- Notable commanders: Major Wilhelm von Müffling (first); Oberstleutnant Carl von Borcke (last)

The 2nd Foot Guards Regiment or the 2nd Guards Regiment of Foot (German: 2. Garde-Regiment zu Fuß) was an infantry regiment of the Prussian Army, and later the Imperial German Army, formed on 20 June 1813.

== History ==
=== War of the Sixth Coalition ===
The regiment was formed on 20 June 1813 at Neudorf. In the same year, the regiment fought in the War of the Sixth Coalition, participating in the Battle of Leipzig. The unit had also received multiple decorations, with the 1st Battalion receiving 11 Iron Crosses (2nd Class) and several Russian orders at the Battle of Lützen, and later receiving 1 Iron Cross (1st Class) and 12 Iron Crosses (2nd Class) at Bautzen.

=== Austro-Prussian War ===
The regiment became part of the Second Army of Crown Prince Friedrich Wilhelm of Prussia. On 28 June 1866, at the Battle of Burkersdorf, the 1st Company captured two Austrian 8-pounder guns. On 29 June, the unit fought at the Battle of Königinhof, and then later fought at the Battle of Königgrätz.

=== First World War ===
In 1914, the regiment fought as part of the 2nd Army at the First Battle of the Marne, as well as at the Battle of Arras. In 1915, it participated in a number of winter engagements at Champagne before being transferred to the Eastern Front, where it fought in the Gorlice-Tarnów Offensive. After engagements with the Russian Army at the Bug and Jasiolda rivers, the unit was transferred back to the Western Front.

In the summer of 1916, the unit fought in the Battle of the Somme. The unit later fought in the Second Battle of the Aisne in the spring of 1917. It also participated in engagements in the Argonne Forest before being transferred back to the Eastern Front, where it saw combat in Eastern Galicia as well as during the Riga offensive. Following the armistice with Russia on the Eastern Front, the unit was once again transferred to the Western Front. From April 1918, the unit participated in the German spring offensive. The unit was demobilized following the Armistice of Compiègne.

== Regiment commanders ==
The first commander of the regiment was Major Wilhelm von Müffling, who served from 19 June 1813 until 12 December 1815. He was followed by Konstantin von Quadt-Wykradt-Hüchtenbruck, who served from 12 December 1815 until 29 March 1832.

The unit's last commander was Oberstleutnant Carl von Borcke, who served from 14 December 1918 until 19 February 1919.
