= Pilníkov =

- Town
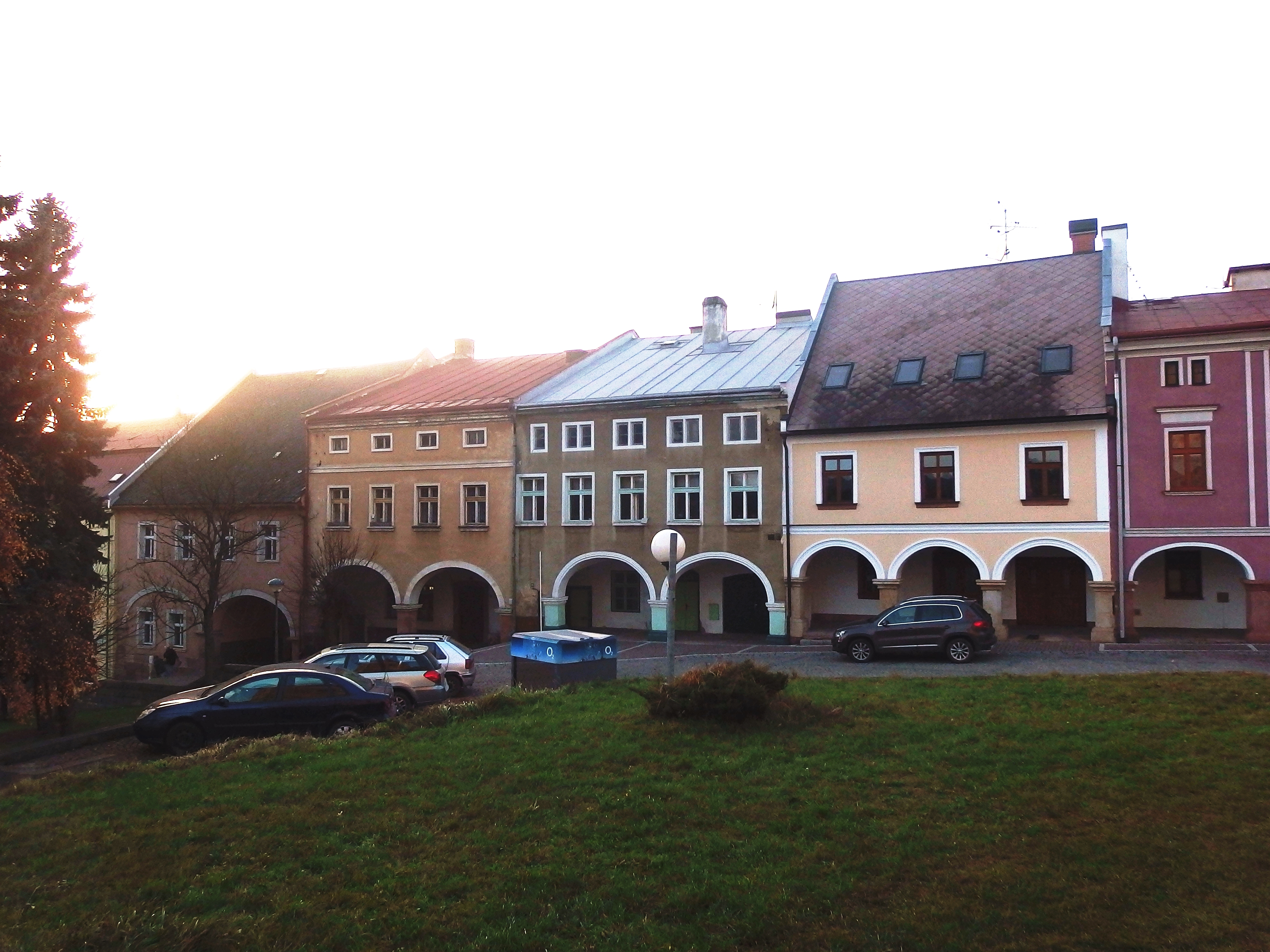
- Town square

- Flag Coat of arms

- Location in the Czech Republic
- Coordinates: 50°31′58″N 15°49′12″E
- Country: Czech Republic
- Region: Hradec Králové
- District: Trutnov
- First mentioned: 1357

Government
  - Mayor: Josef Červený

Area
  - Total: 16.99 km^{2} (6.56 sq mi)
- Elevation: 358 m (1,175 ft)

Population (2026-01-01)
  - Total: 1,209
  - Density: 71.16/km^{2} (184.3/sq mi)
- Time zone: UTC+1 (CET)
  - Summer (DST): UTC+2 (CEST)
- Postal code: 542 42
- Website: www.pilnikov.cz

Pilníkov (Czech pronunciation: [ˈpɪlɲiːkof]; German: Pilnikau) is a town in Trutnov District in the Hradec Králové Region of the Czech Republic. It has about 1,200 inhabitants. The town is located in the Giant Mountains Foothills.

Pilníkov was founded in the second half of the 13th century. The historic town centre is well preserved and is protected as an urban monument zone. The most important monument of Pilníkov is the Church of the Holy Trinity.

== Etymology ==
The initial German name of the settlement was Billungsdorf, meaning "Billung's village". In the 14th century, the name evolved to Pilungsdorf and then to Pilingsdorf, which was transcribed into Czech as Pilínkov. Due to its similarity with the Czech words pilný ('diligent') and pilník ('file'), the name was distorted to Pilníkov.

== Geography ==
Pilníkov is located about 7 kilometres (4 mi) southwest of Trutnov and 36 km (22 mi) north of Hradec Králové. It lies in the Giant Mountains Foothills. The highest point is at 550 m (1,804 ft) above sea level. The town is situated at the confluence of the streams of Pilníkovský potok and Starobucký potok.

== History ==
The first written mention of Pilníkov is from 1357. The village was founded in the second half of the 13th century. It was promoted to a town by King Vladislaus II in 1514. From 1623 to 1627, it was owned by Albrecht von Wallenstein. The town was badly damaged during the Thirty Years' War and depopulated, but it recovered. From 1675 to 1789, it was owned by a branch of the Schwarzenberg family as a part of the Vlčice estate. From 1789 to 1868, the estate was held by the Barons Theers of Silberstein.

== Demographics ==
Historical population

Year	Pop.	±%
1869	1,829	—
1880	1,820	−0.5%
1890	1,870	+2.7%
1900	1,796	−4.0%
1910	1,895	+5.5%

Year	Pop.	±%
1921	1,724	−9.0%
1930	1,812	+5.1%
1950	1,208	−33.3%
1961	1,308	+8.3%
1970	1,194	−8.7%

Year	Pop.	±%
1980	1,159	−2.9%
1991	1,067	−7.9%
2001	1,064	−0.3%
2011	1,239	+16.4%
2021	1,182	−4.6%

Source: Censuses

== Transport ==
The I/16 road from Trutnov to Jičín runs through the town.

Pilníkov is located on the railway lines Trutnov–Kolín and Trutnov–Vrchlabí.

== Sights ==
The main landmark is the Church of the Holy Trinity in the middle of the town square. The original wooden church was as old as the town. In 1604–1605, the brick Renaissance tower was added. After the wooden church fell into disrepair, it was demolished. In 1769–1772, it was replaced by a late Baroque building with Rococo elements. Its current appearance is from 1904, after it was damaged by a fire in 1820 and reconstructed.

There are preserved burgher houses on the town square. The historic town centre is protected as an urban monument zone.
