= Adolf von Bonin =

Albert Ferdinand Adolf Karl Friedrich von Bonin
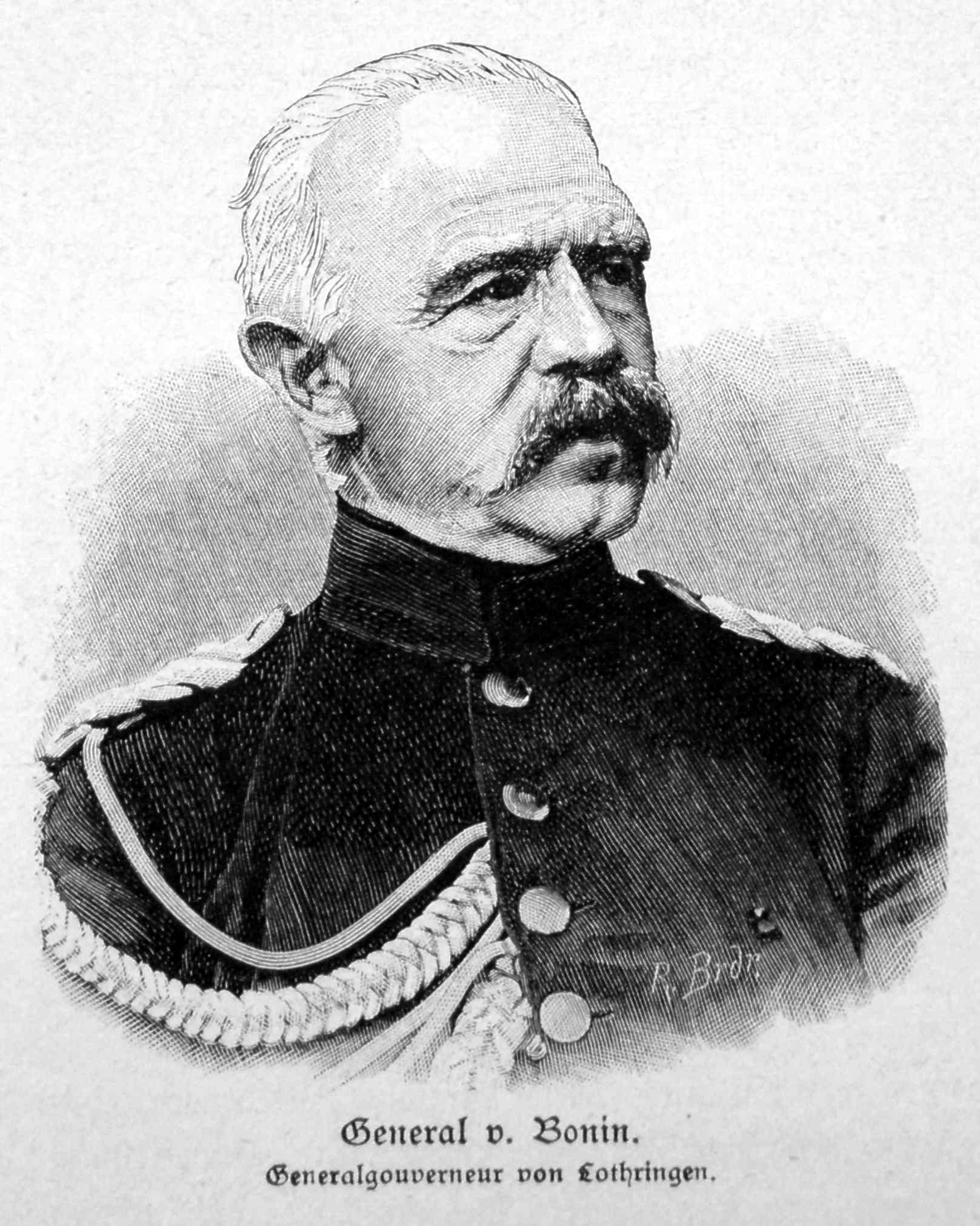
- Born: 11 November 1803; Heeren, Altmark
- Died: 16 April 1872 (aged 68); Berlin
- Military career
- Allegiance: Kingdom of Prussia
- Branch: Army
- Rank: General of the Infantry
- Commands: Prussian I Corps
- Conflicts: Battle of Trautenau (Austro-Prussian War)

Albert Ferdinand Adolf Karl Friedrich von Bonin (11 November 1803 in Heeren, Altmark – 16 April 1872 in Berlin) was a corps commander of the Prussian Army at the Battle of Trautenau in 1866, and a colleague of Karl Friedrich von Steinmetz. He made his military career from Oberst (1851), Major general (1854) to Lieutenant general and adjutant of the king (1858). In 1863 he became Kommanierender General and 1864 General of the Infantry.

During the Austro-Prussian War he commanded I Corps. He was beaten back at Trautenau, before participating in the Battle of Königgrätz.

== Honours and awards ==
- Belgium: Grand Cordon of the Order of Leopold (military), 27 January 1861
