= Battle of Skalitz =

1866 battle of the Austro-Prussian War

Coordinates: 50°24′10″N 16°4′12″E

- Part of Austro-Prussian War
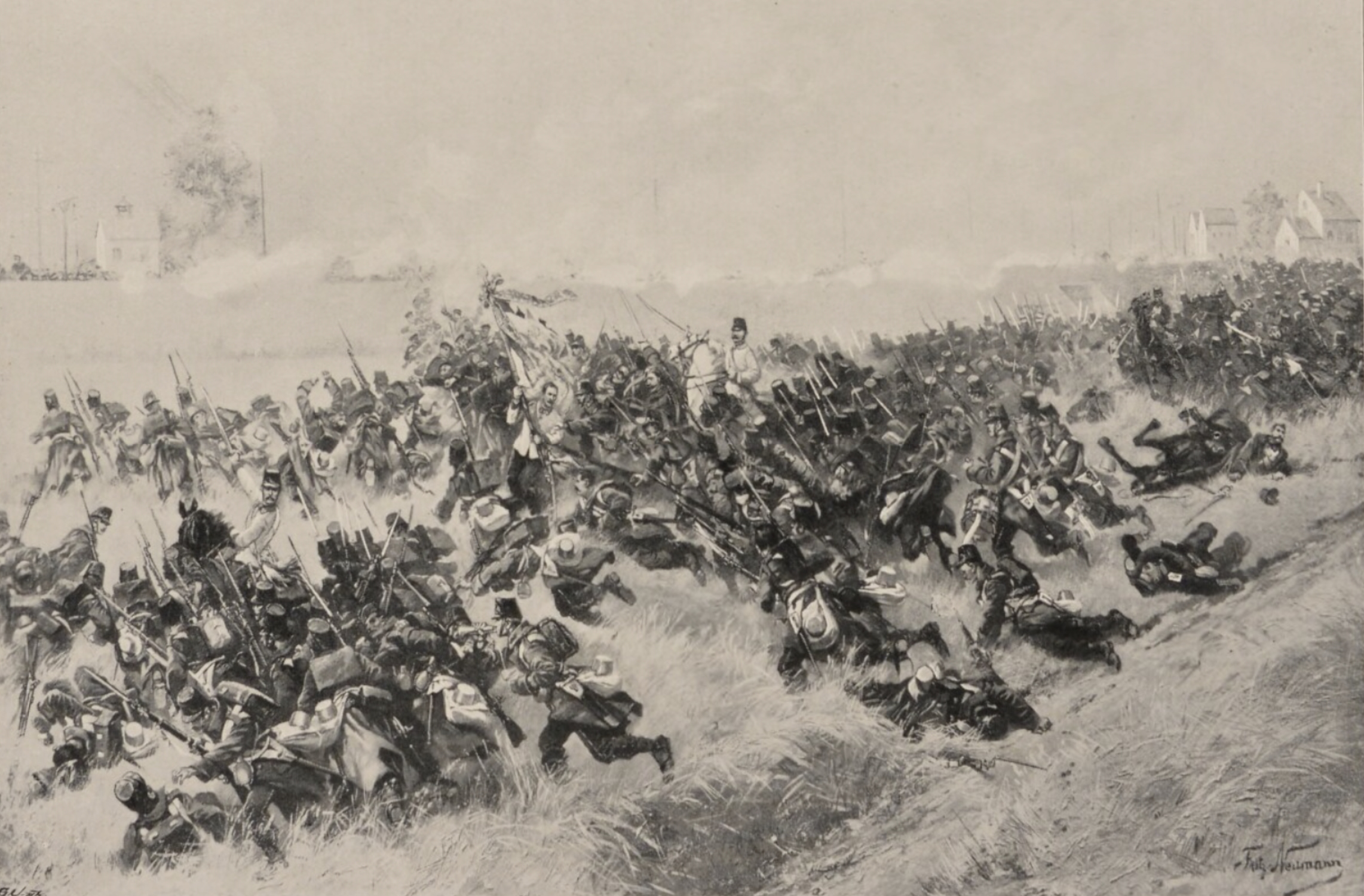
- 77th Infantry Regiment "Archduke Karl Salvator" in the battle of Skalitz, June 28 1866 (Fritz Neumann, 1906)
Date	28 June 1866
Location	Česká Skalice, Bohemia, modern day Czech Republic
Result	Prussian victory

Belligerents
(Kingdom of Prussia) Prussia	(Austrian Empire) Austria

Commanders and leaders
Karl Friedrich von Steinmetz	Archduke Leopold

Casualties and losses
1,367	5,577

The Battle of Skalitz was a minor engagement in the Königgratz/Sadowa campaign of the Austro-Prussian War of 1866 in Bohemia on 28 June. Following the Prussian victory at the Battle of Náchod the previous day (27 June), the Prussian forces, led by General of the Infantry Steinmetz, advanced on Skalitz (Česká Skalice) and defeated the forces of Archduke Leopold.

== Events ==
Having been beaten the previous day by Steinmetz at Náchod, the Austrians had regrouped at the Aupa heights near Skalice, a town with only one bridge over the Úpa river. There Ramming's VI Corps was relieved by Archduke Leopold's VIII Corps. Benedek, having reached the field and scouted the terrain, decided by 11:00 am to abandon any thought of counterattacking the Prussians with the combined VI, VIII and IV Corps, resumed his march towards Jičín, and ordered the VIII Corps to abandon Skalice if by 2:00 pm no serious battle had started. After transmitting these orders Benedek departed towards his main army. Merely 15 minutes after Benedek left, the battle erupted.

While the Austrians prevaricated, Steinmetz decided at 8:30 am to send eight infantry battalions and three batteries of the 9th Division to test the VIII Corps' left flank, while his 10th Division would engage and pin the Austrian center. By 11:00 the 9th Division was nearing the Fragnern brigade and the Prussians infiltrated the tactically vital Dubno Forest. At 12:30 Fragnern on his own initiative decided to use his brigade to dislodge the Prussians in the woods and he left his strong position atop the hill to attack them in the woods. General Fragnern's charge was met by concentrated Prussian infantry fire from the Dreyse needle gun and he was killed and 3,000 men of his brigade were killed or wounded. Fragnern's brigade was shattered and abandoned the field in panic.

The next brigade in the Austrian line, Kreyssern's, was then sucked into the ill conceived Austrian counter push. Feeling obliged to shore up Fragnern's faltering brigade, General Kreyssern sent five battalions to support the fleeing regiments from Fragnern's command. Kreyssern's battalions were met by a Prussian grenadier regiment from 9th Division and a brigade from 10th Division near the railway embankment. Kreyssern was killed during the fire fight and his brigade collapsed, enabling the Prussians to reach Skalice's railway station. 10th Division then attacked VIII Corps' center and right while 9th Division turned the Austrian left flank. At 2:15 pm, recognizing the danger of being cut off from his lone bridge, Archduke Leopold ordered VIII Corps to retreat, which turned into a headlong flight. By 3:00 pm the Prussians had taken Skalice.

== Results ==
Having been led by an incompetent princely commander who, according to Wawro, did not give a single order during the battle, and subordinates launching attacks without orders, the Austrian VIII Corps was badly mauled. In all it lost about 6,000 men, amongst which were 3,000 prisoners. As a cause of the battle, Benedek prevaricated and halted Northern Army's advance on Jičín, which enabled the Prussian armies to link up and envelop his army, and ultimately lead to his defeat at Königgrätz.
