= Battle of Náchod =

Battle during the Austro-Prussian War

Coordinates: 50°25′34″N 16°11′40″E

- Part of Austro-Prussian War
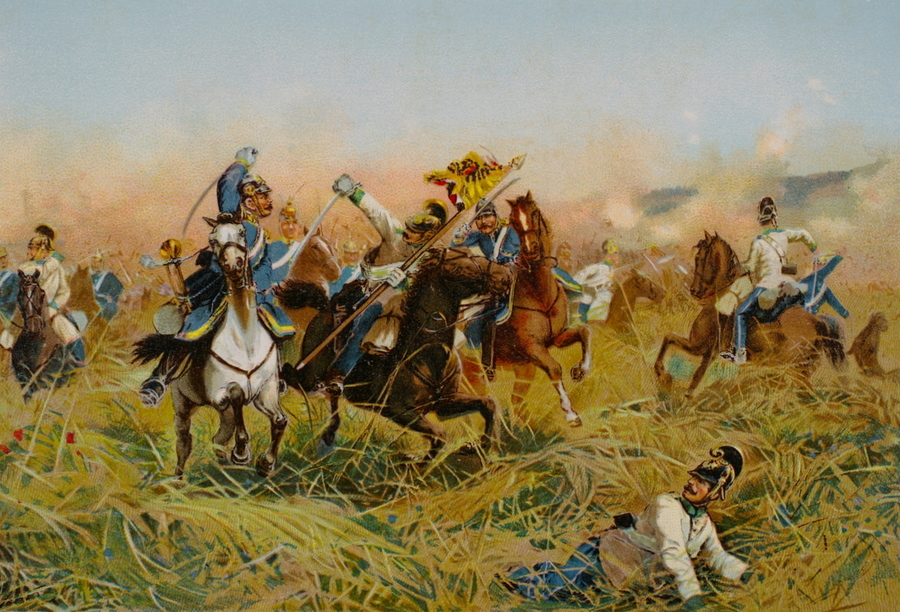
- Cavalry clash at the Battle of Náchod by Richard Knötel; Although it was a great infantry victory, the 2nd Silesian Dragoon Regiment No. 8 played a significant role, with cavalry charges, including this famous scene by trumpeter Adolph Duchale, who captured the flag of the Austrian 5th Chevauxlegers Regiment despite fierce resistance, being particularly noteworthy. The numerically superior Austrians suffered heavy losses and were forced to flee.
Date	27 June 1866
Location	Náchod, Bohemia
Result	Prussian victory

Belligerents
Prussia	Austrian Empire

Commanders and leaders
(Kingdom of Prussia) Von Steinmetz	(Austrian Empire) Von Ramming

Casualties and losses
1,122	5,719

The Battle of Náchod (German: Nachod) on 27 June 1866 was the first major action of the Austro-Prussian War. The advance guard of General Karl Friedrich von Steinmetz's 5th Corps occupied some high ground near Náchod as part of a Prussian advance into Bohemia from Silesia. Elements of the Austrian 6th Corps under General Von Ramming came on the scene and attacked the Prussians but were repulsed. As more Austrians arrived, they were ordered into attacks which proved both costly and unsuccessful. Finally, the badly mauled Austrians retreated from the field. The Prussian infantry enjoyed a technical advantage in having the needle gun, a breech-loading rifle that could be fired and loaded from a prone position. Consequently, the Austrian infantry, which were only equipped with muzzle-loading rifles, suffered a disproportionate number of casualties.

== Events ==
The Prussian Second Army, invading Bohemia, had to split up in order to negotiate the passes of the Giant Mountains. General Karl Friedrich von Steinmetz's 5th Corps was nearly caught as it emerged from a gully by the town of Náchod, Bohemia. The King's Grenadiers were in the advance guard, and raced forward, first to occupy some woods outside the gully's opening, and then to take possession of the heights above Václavice (Wenzelsberg).

To counter the danger of the Prussians flanking his army, during the evening of 26 June, Benedek finally decided to send Ramming's VI Corps to Náchod to block the passes. Benedek's orders were only received by Ramming at 1:30 AM on 27 June. The first Austrian troops started up at 3:30 AM, the bulk of the corps started at 5:00 AM, without having eaten.

The Austrian Colonel Hertwegh was supposed to occupy the next village of Vysokov so as to block the road, but instead, when at 9:00 AM he got to Václavice he on his own initiative wheeled right to attack the Prussians on the ridge above; the King's Grenadiers simply mowed his men down. It was now that the superiority of Prussian equipment made itself felt. Their new breech-loading needle guns enabled them to fire three shots to the Austrians’ muzzle-loader's one. The Prussian cavalry now rode forward along the road to stop the Austrians reaching Vysokov, and here a cavalry battle developed.

The King's Grenadiers now came down the slope over the bodies of Hertwegh's men and occupied Václavice. At 10:45 AM a new Austrian brigade (Jonak) arrived and a fearful struggle ensued over the churchyard. The grenadiers were driven out of it but held on to most of the village for two hours while the rest of the 9th Division arrived.

A third Austrian brigade (Rosenzweig's) appeared, and this time it had unmistakable orders to take Vysokov. As the famous Viennese Hoch-und-Deutschmeister Regiment, the last fighting vestige of the old Teutonic Order, burst into the town, Colonel Louis von Blumenthal arrived at the head of the 52nd Foot on their right flank. Though the fighting continued, the result was now not in doubt.

At 1:00 PM Ramming decided to untangle by escaping forward and he committed his final brigade – Waldstätten's – to clear the woods around Kleny, pivot on Rosenzweig's left and take the town, and then turn Steinmetz's flank in order to push the Prussians back in to the pass. Using their numerically superior 42 gun artillery strength – the bulk of the Austrian guns were still struck in traffic – to pummel Waldstätten, a Prussian regiment attacked Rosenzweig in Václavice and a fresh regiment flanked Waldstätten's columns. At 2:00 PM, having spent all his reserve, Ramming commanded a retreat to Česká Skalice (Skalitz), where he united with his artillery batteries to form an 80 gun grand battery and took up position behind a railway embankment.

Steinmetz elected not to follow up the Austrians but decided to concentrate his scattered units at the heights.

== Results ==
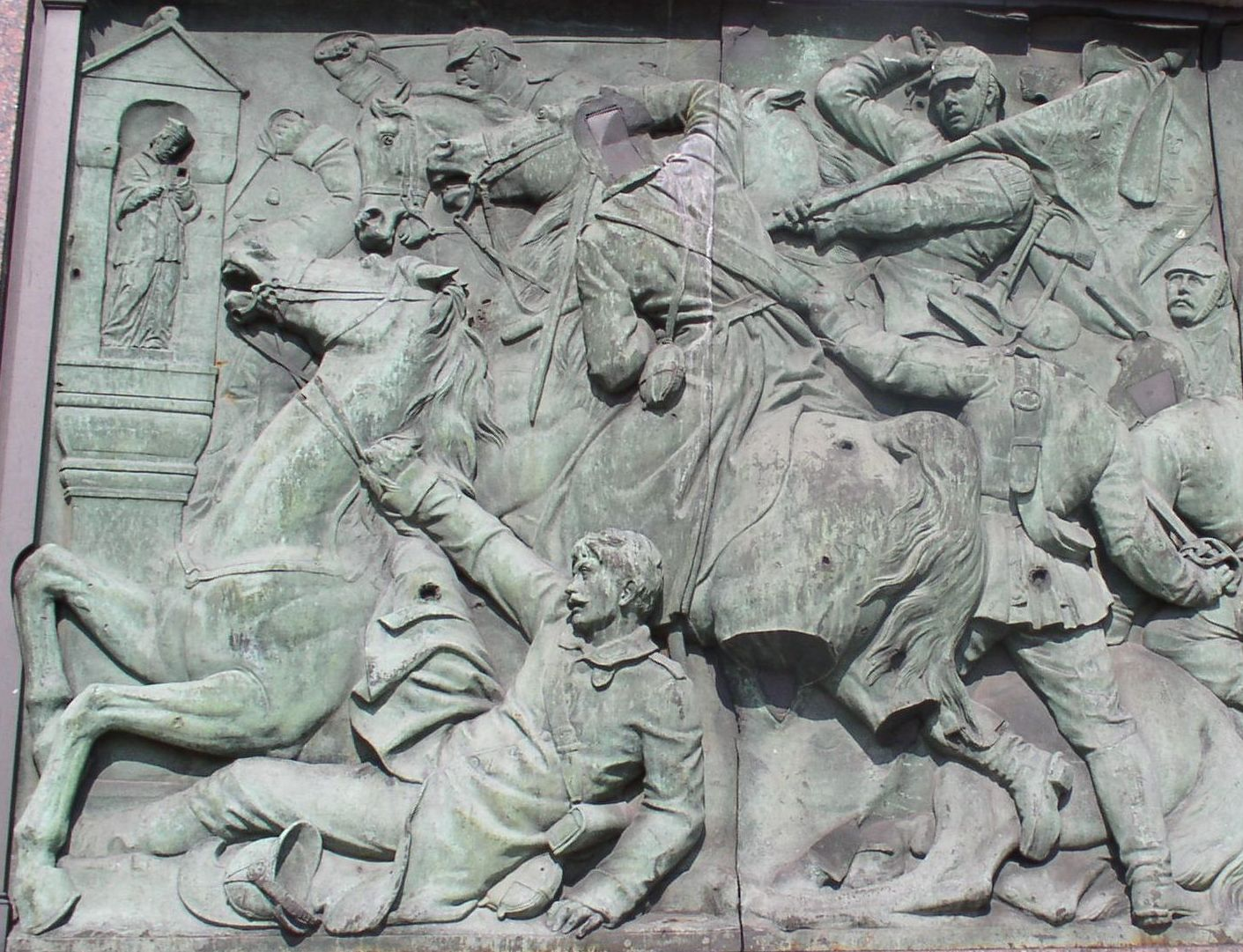
Battle of Nachod on a relief in Berlin, by Moritz Schulz, 1872

Having through muddled staff orders started too late to reach the commanding heights first, the Austrian VI Corps brigades, exhausted from a six-hour march, were committed piecemeal against the Prussians commanding the heights. The Prussian firepower goaded the Austrians into courageous but costly bayonet charges; their officers lost control, and five and a half thousand men fell to the Prussians' thousand. The news electrified Berlin. Von Steinmetz was hailed as the "Lion of Náchod", and Bismarck found for the first time in his life that he was popular. Strategically, Ramming's loss meant the Austrians lost control of one of the passes giving entry into Bohemia. It also meant that Glabenz' Corps was left in the air at Trutnov (Trautenau), and ultimately meant that the Prussian army could advance towards a union with the other Prussian armies.

== Literature ==
- Lydia Baštecká, Ivana Ebelová, 'Náchod', Nachod 2004, ISBN 80-7106-674-5
- Wilhelm Mader, Chronik der Stadt Lewin, Lewin 1868
- Slavomir Ravik, Tam u Králového Hradce, Praha 2001, ISBN 80-242-0584-X
- Heinz Helmert; Hans-Jürgen Usczeck: Preussisch-deutsche Kriege von 1864 bis 1871 - Militärischer Verlauf, 6. überarbeitete Auflage, Militärverlag der deutschen demokratischen Republik, Berlin 1988, ISBN 3-327-00222-3
