= Karl Friedrich von Steinmetz =

Prussian field marshal (1796–1877)

Generalfeldmarschall Karl Friedrich von Steinmetz
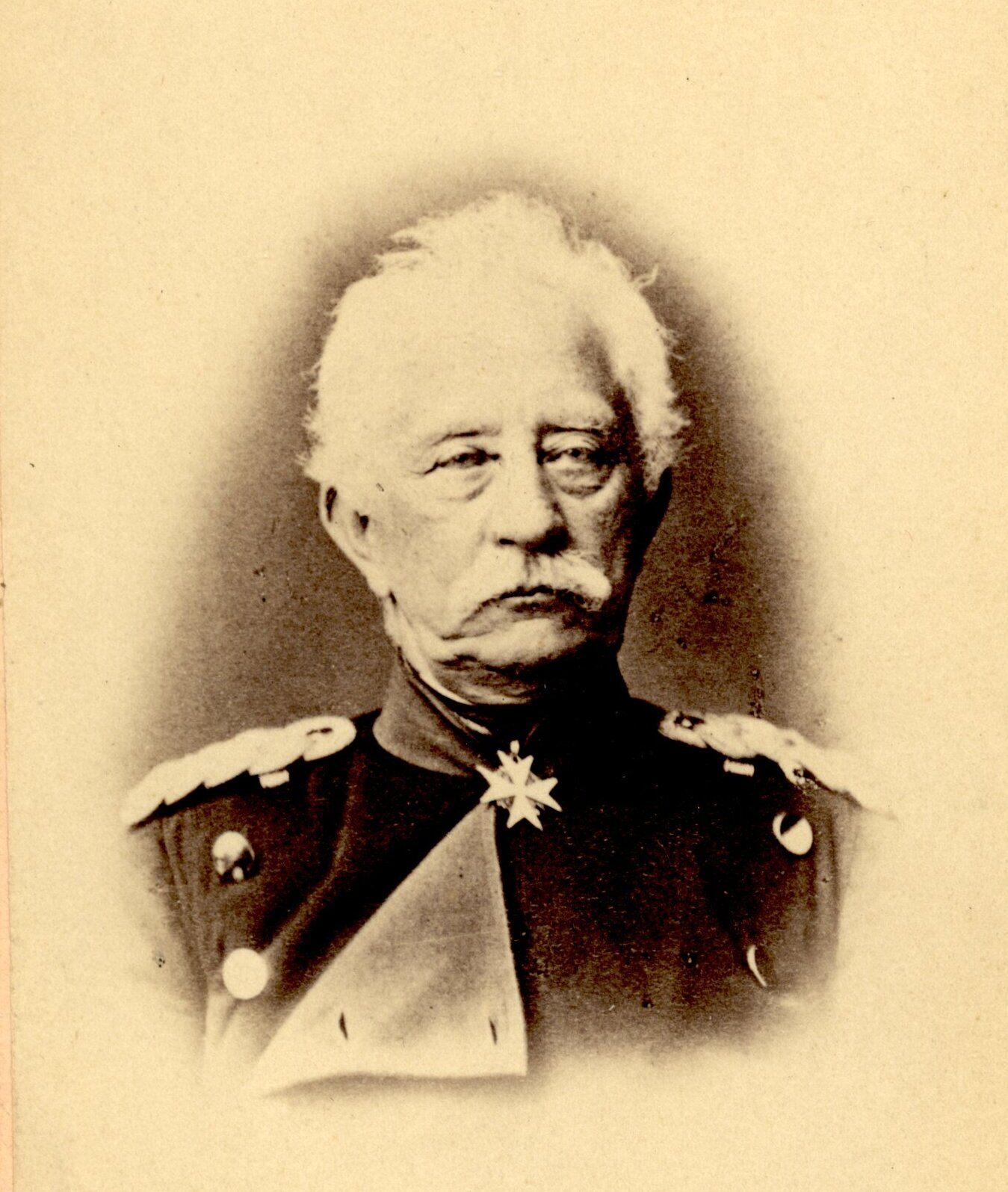
- Photograph of Steinmetz, c. 1865–1877

Member of the Reichstag
- In office 24 February 1867 – 18 January 1871
- Monarch: Wilhelm I
- Preceded by: Position Established
- Succeeded by: Position Abolished

Personal details
- Born: 27 December 1796 Eisenach, Thuringia, Holy Roman Empire
- Died: 2 August 1877 (aged 80) Bad Landeck, Silesia, German Empire (now Lądek-Zdrój, Poland)
- Party: Independent
- Spouse: Elise von Krosigk (m. 1867)
- Awards: Pour le Mérite; Order of the Black Eagle; Order of the Red Eagle; Iron Cross
- Nickname: Lion of Nachod

Military service
- Allegiance: Kingdom of Prussia; North German Confederation; German Empire
- Branch/service: Prussian Army; Imperial German Army
- Years of service: 1813–1871
- Rank: Generalfeldmarschall
- Commands: II Corps; V Corps; First Army
- Battles/wars: See battles: Napoleonic Wars; War of the Sixth Coalition; Battle of Leipzig; Battle of Paris; First Schleswig War; Battle of Schleswig; Austro-Prussian War; Battle of Náchod; Battle of Skalitz; Battle of Schweinschädel; Franco-Prussian War; Battle of Spicheren; Battle of Gravelotte

Karl Friedrich von Steinmetz (27 December 1796 – 2 August 1877) was a Prussian Generalfeldmarschall. He was born at Eisenach and joined the army of Prussia during the War of Liberation. Over the Seven Weeks' War he led the V Corps against Austria and became known as the Lion of Nachod for his victories as the Battles of Nachod, Skalitz, and Schweinschädel. Steinmetz commanded one of three armies assembled on the Rhine for the Franco-Prussian War, during which he quarreled with Prince Friedrich Karl. After the war he retired.

== Early life and Napoleonic Wars ==
Steinmetz was born at Eisenach on 27 December 1796 and was educated at the cadet school of Stolp in Pomerania from 1807 to 1811, in the midst of the misery and poverty caused by the French occupation. He showed great ability in military education. At the outbreak of the War of Liberation he and his elder brother made their way through the French positions to Breslau, where they were at once appointed to the army, the elder as ensign on probation, the younger to the substantive rank of second lieutenant. After a vain attempt to transfer to the Blücher Hussars, a regiment he had an intense boyish admiration for when it was quartered at Stolp, he was ordered to report to General Ludwig von Yorck, who treated him and the other officers from Breslau with coldness, until Steinmetz asked about returning to the king who had sent him.

The brothers were in the hardest fighting of the campaign of 1813, the elder being killed at the Battle of Leipzig and the younger being wounded more than once. During the short halt on the Rhine he improved his military and general education. In the battles in France, he won the Iron Cross, Second Class. After the peace, he entered Paris only once, fearing to spend the ten ducats that sent monthly to his mother. For the same reason, he did not take part in the pleasures of his better-off comrades.

== Service in Prussia ==
=== Character and marriage ===
Steinmetz's avoidance of youthful excesses helped him overcome bad health and become physically vigorous, which he was to the end of his military career. His character as well as his physique was strengthened by his Spartan way of life, but his temperament was embittered by the circumstances which imposed this self-restraint. His poverty and want of influence were the more obvious as he was, shortly after the wars, assigned to the lowly 2nd Foot Guards, stationed in Berlin.

He rigorously devoted himself to study and his professional duties. From 1820 to 1824 he studied at the General War Academy, graduating from the course with distinction, and so was appointed to the topographical section of the general staff. General von Müffling reported that he was arrogant and resented encouragement, which he probably regarded as patronising, but that his ability would outdistance his comrades. Steinmetz was too poor to buy a good horse or a house, and he had to live in his regimental quarters. However, shortly after his marriage to his cousin Julie, the daughter of Lieutenant-General KFF von Steinmetz (1768–1837), gave him enough money to temper his resentment, since his father-in-law was generous to the young couple, and helped him get an appointment as captain at the Landwehr Guard at Potsdam. His brigade commander, General von Röder, was an excellent soldier, and Steinmetz often spoke of the thorough training he received.

=== Garrison duty ===
From 1830 his regimental work went on without incident in various garrisons, until in 1839 he was promoted to major given command of a battalion. In this position he had many differences with his superiors, for he urged strenuous training for the troops, in all seasons. However, his off-duty relationships were extremely cordial, thanks chiefly to the social gifts of his wife.

In 1848, he commanded a guard battalion during the disturbances in Berlin, but was not involved. The same year, he was sent to fight in the First Schleswig War. After the Battle of Schleswig, Wrangel, the commander-in-chief, told him that he had decided the battle. He distinguished himself again at Düppel, and Prince Wilhelm decorated him with the order Pour le Mérite.

On returning to Germany, he was given the difficult command of troops at Brandenburg during the sitting of a democratic popular convention there, troops known to be affected by the revolution. During the Olmütz-Bronnzell incident of 1850, he was military governor of Cassel. In 1851, he became colonel commandant of the cadet school of Berlin, where he reformed the prevailing system of instruction, the defects of which he had condemned as early as 1820. Though more than fifty years of age, he learned Latin and English to be a more competent instructor.

== General officer ==
=== 1854-1864 ===
In 1854, after forty-one years of active service, he was promoted major-general. At Magdeburg, as at Berlin, his reforming zeal made him many enemies, and in October his youngest and only surviving child died at twenty-six, which affected him deeply. In 1857, he was posted to the command of a guard brigade at Berlin, and thence almost immediately to a divisional command in the I Corps. Early in 1858 he was promoted lieutenant-general, and for the five years that he held this command he devoted himself to cavalry. In 1863, learning that Adolf von Bonin, his senior by date of rank, but his junior in age and length of service, was to be appointed to the command of the I Corps, he considered retirement. However, when Bonin took command, Steinmetz was given command of the II Corps. Shortly afterwards, the crown prince of Prussia Frederick William took over II Corps and Steinmetz went to command the V Corps at Posen. Soon after this his wife died.

=== Austro-Prussian War ===
He was promoted to general of infantry in 1864, and led the V Corps in the Austro-Prussian War of 1866. It was part of the Second Army of Crown Prince Frederick William. On 26 June 1866 Steinmetz and his reinforced corps were ready to enter Austrian territory as the advance guard of the army's left column. In the evening of that day the border was crossed on the road leading from Glatz to Bohemia via Reinerz. On the following day he encountered troops of Wilhelm von Ramming, the resulting Battle of Náchod ending in a Prussian victory. He likewise was victorious in the battles of Skalitz and Schweinschädel on the following days. His skillful and resolute leadership was displayed in three battles on three successive days. He later opened the way through the mountains in spite of Bonin's defeat at Trautenau. In 1867, the "Lion of Nachod", as he was popularly called, married Elise von Krosigk (who after his death married Count Bruhl). He was now, for the first time in his life, a fairly wealthy man, having been awarded a money grant for his brilliant services in 1866. About this time he was elected a member of the North German Confederation parliament.

=== Franco-Prussian War ===
At the outbreak of the Franco-Prussian War in 1870, Steinmetz was appointed to command one of the three armies assembled on the Rhine, the others being led by Prince Frederick Charles and the crown prince. It was not long before serious differences arose between Steinmetz and Prince Frederick Charles. Steinmetz, embittered by his lifelong struggle against the influences of wealth and position, saw an order to clear the roads for the prince's army as an attempt to crowd a humbler comrade out of the fighting, and various incidents.

On 6 August he led the First Army south from his position on the Moselle and moved straight toward the town of Spicheren, cutting off Prince Frederick Charles from his forward cavalry units in the process. There he encountered the French II Corps under Frossard, which was fortified between Spicheren and Forbach and was able to stall him until the German Second Army came to the aid of their compatriots and routed the French.

Eight days later he again encountered the French army at Borny-Colombey. At the Battle of Gravelotte he lost his temper and wasted his troops against a French superior position, nearly causing the defeat of the Prussian armies. After this he was relieved of command and sent home as governor-general of the V and VI Army Corps districts.

As a commander in the Franco-Prussian War and the Battle of Gravelotte, Steinmetz was mentioned a few times in Chapter IV of anti-war short story entitled "Bartek The winner", written by Polish Nobel-awarded writer Henryk Sienkiewicz.

== Promotion to field marshal and later life ==
In April 1871, he retired at his own request, but his great services were not forgotten when victory had softened animosities, and he was promoted to field marshal, given a pension of 2000 thalers and made a member of the upper chamber. In the spirit of loyalty which had guided his whole career, he made no attempt to justify his conduct in 1870. His life in retirement was quiet and happy, and he remained healthy to the last. He died at Bad Landeck on 2 August 1877.

== Honours and awards ==
The 37th Fusiliers of the German army bore his name as part of their regimental title.

=== Orders and decorations ===
- Kingdom of Prussia:
  - Iron Cross, 2nd Class "Honour Senior", on Black Band with White Edge, 31 March 1814 (1813); 1st Class (1870)
  - Pour le Mérite (military), 19 September 1848; with Oak Leaves, 16 June 1871
  - Commander's Cross of the Royal House Order of Hohenzollern, 18 January 1856
  - Knight of the Order of the Prussian Crown, 1st Class (50 years), 3 March 1863; with Enamel Band of the Red Eagle and Oak Leaves, 1865
  - Grand Cross of the Order of the Red Eagle, with Oak Leaves and Swords, 15 July 1866
  - Knight of the Order of the Black Eagle, 15 July 1866; with Collar, 1867
- Hohenzollern: Cross of Honour of the Princely House Order of Hohenzollern, 1st Class with Swords
- Ascanian duchies: Commander of the House Order of Albert the Bear, 2nd Class, 12 March 1848
- Mecklenburg-Schwerin: Military Merit Cross, 1st Class
- Austrian Empire: Commander of the Imperial Order of Leopold, 1852
- Russian Empire:
  - Knight of the Order of St. George, 3rd Class, December 1870
  - Knight of the Order of St. Andrew, in Diamonds

== Literature ==
- Endnote:
  - See supplement of Militär Wochenblatt (1877 and 1878).
