= Vysokov =

- Municipality
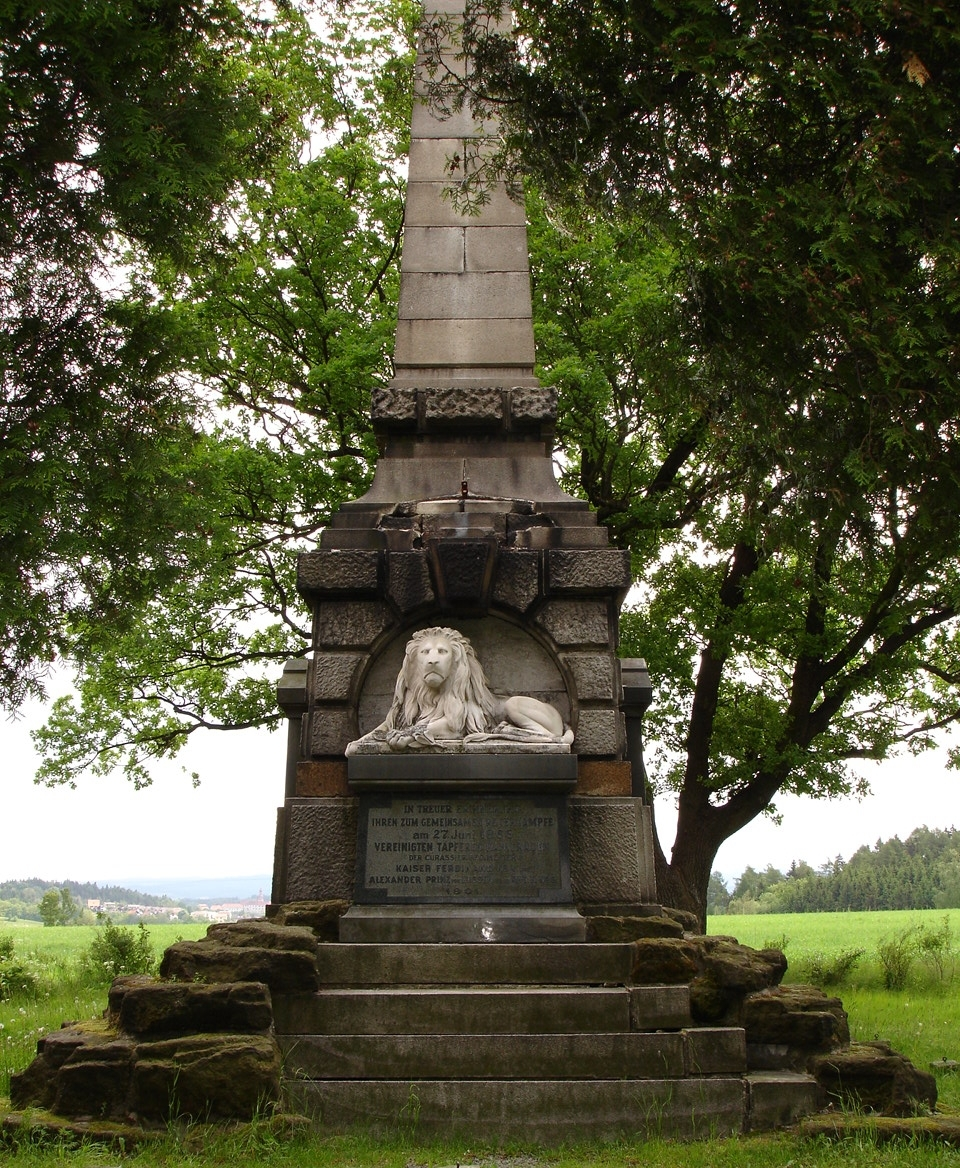
- Monument to the fallen in the Battle of Náchod

- Flag Coat of arms

- Location in the Czech Republic
- Coordinates: 50°24′14″N 16°7′0″E
- Country: Czech Republic
- Region: Hradec Králové
- District: Náchod
- First mentioned: 1465

Area
  - Total: 5.68 km^{2} (2.19 sq mi)
- Elevation: 362 m (1,188 ft)

Population (2026-01-01)
  - Total: 534
  - Density: 94.0/km^{2} (243/sq mi)
- Time zone: UTC+1 (CET)
  - Summer (DST): UTC+2 (CEST)
- Postal code: 549 12
- Website: www.vysokov.cz

Vysokov (German: Hohenfeld) is a municipality and village in Náchod District in the Hradec Králové Region of the Czech Republic. It has about 500 inhabitants.

== Demographics ==
Historical population
Year	Pop.	±%
1869	646	—
1880	675	+4.5%
1890	645	−4.4%
1900	699	+8.4%
1910	699	+0.0%
1921	682	−2.4%
1930	604	−11.4%
1950	522	−13.6%
1961	469	−10.2%
1970	427	−9.0%
1980	419	−1.9%
1991	366	−12.6%
2001	396	+8.2%
2011	455	+14.9%
2021	482	+5.9%
Source: Censuses
