= Wilhelm von Ramming =

Wilhelm Freiherr von Ramming von Riedkirchen
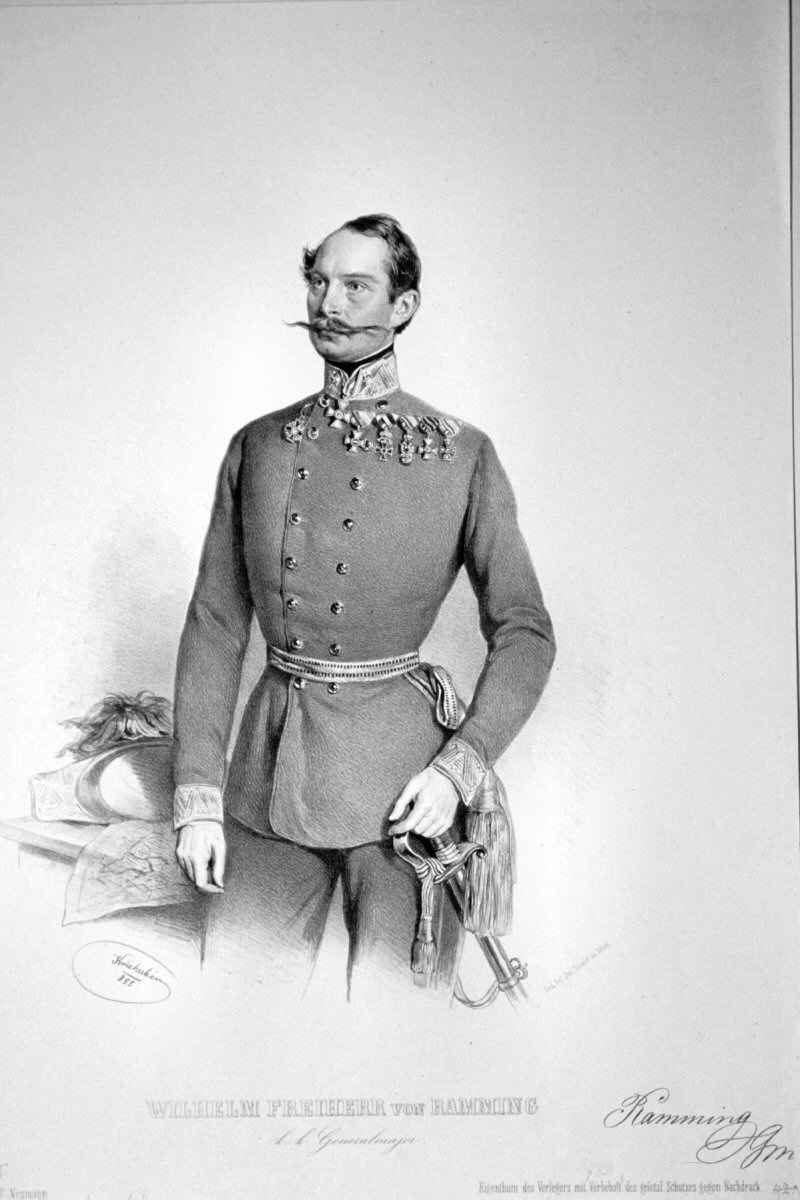
- Born: 30 June 1815; Nemošice
- Died: 1 July 1876 (aged 61); Karlsbad
- Military career
- Allegiance: Austrian Empire
- Service years: 1827–1876
- Rank: Feldzeugmeister
- Commands: VI Corps
- Conflicts: First Italian War of Independence; Second Italian War of Independence; Hungarian Revolution of 1848; Austro-Prussian War
- Awards: Military Order of Maria Theresa

Wilhelm Freiherr von Ramming von Riedkirchen (30 June 1815 - 1 July 1876) was an Austrian Feldzeugmeister who commanded an army corps during the Austro-Prussian War.

== Biography ==
After attending the Wiener Neustadt Military Academy, Wilhelm Ramming was appointed in October 1834 as a lieutenant in the Cuirassier Regiment No. 7, with whom he served for the next five years. On 30 November 1839, he became a lieutenant in the staff of the General Quartermaster. He was promoted to captain on 20 June 1845. During the First Italian War of Independence he served under FML Haynau and participated in the attack on Brescia and the siege of Fort Malghera, as well as in the battles against the insurgents at Pieve di Cadore. On 4 June 1849, he was appointed lieutenant colonel.

During the Hungarian Revolution Ramming took part in the battles at Szered, Raab, Komorn and Szegedin as General Staff of the FZM Haynau. For his services as chief of staff of the army during the summer campaign in Hungary, he was promoted to colonel and awarded the Knight's Cross of the Order of Maria Theresa.

Ramming was ennobled as a baron in 1851. After the peace he remained chief of the general staff of the 3rd Army in Hungary. On 17 May 1854 he was promoted to major general. After he had been chief of the general staff of various army corps for several years, he received a brigade within III. Army Corps and was promoted to Feldmarshall-Leutnant on 28 June 1859.

With his brigade, he took part in the Second Italian War of Independence, where he served in the Battle of Magenta. Thereafter he was assigned to the chief of staff, Heinrich von Heß, as chief of the operations office. After the Peace of Villafranca in 1859, Ramming received the post of Feldmarshall-Leutnant in charge of the operative business in the General Quartermaster's Staff.

In 1864 Ramming was given command of the VI. Army Corps, which he also commanded in the Austro-Prussian War in 1866. Defeated by Steinmetz's V Corps at Náchod on 27 June, Ramming's corps formed the reserve at Skalitz and Sadowa. After the war he served as commanding general in Prague, Sibiu and Brno. In 1868 Ramming was promoted to Feldzeugmeister.

In 1873 he was appointed a lifelong member of the House of Lords.

Wilhelm von Ramming died in Karlsbad on 1 July 1876.

== Bibliography ==
- Geoffrey Wawro, The Austro-Prussian War. Austria's war with Prussia and Italy in 1866 (New York 2007), ISBN 9780521629515
- Constantin von Wurzbach, Ramming von Riedkirchen, Wilhelm Freiherr in Biographisches Lexikon des Kaiserthums Oesterreich. 24. Theil. Kaiserlich-königliche Hof- und Staatsdruckerei, Wien 1872, S. 312–315.
- R. v. R., Ramming von Riedkirchen, Wilhelm Freiherr in Allgemeine Deutsche Biographie (ADB). Band 27, Duncker & Humblot, Leipzig 1888, S. 215–218.
- Christoph Tepperberg, Ramming von Riedkirchen Wilhelm Frh. von in Österreichisches Biographisches Lexikon 1815–1950 (ÖBL). Band 8, Verlag der Österreichischen Akademie der Wissenschaften, Wien 1983, ISBN 3-7001-0187-2, S. 408.
