= Jules de Laveaucoupet =

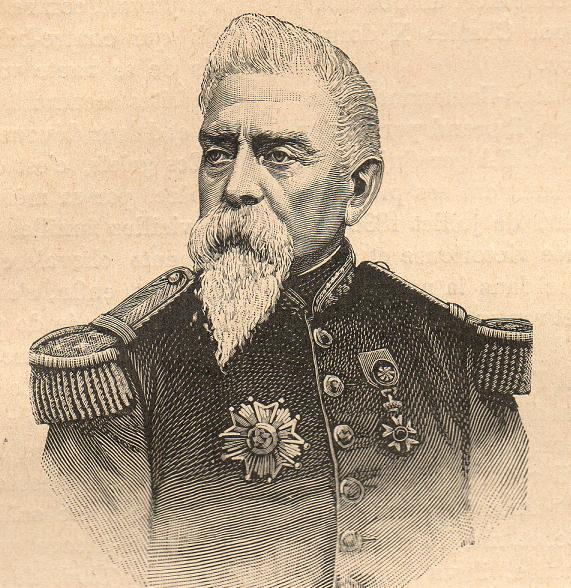
- Général de Laveaucoupet
- Born: April 28, 1806; Saint-Sulpice-le-Dunois, Creuse
- Died: May 18, 1892 (aged 86)
- Military career
- Allegiance: France
- Branch: Army
- Service years: 1824–1871
- Rank: General
- Commands: 3rd division of 2nd Corps (1870)
- Conflicts: Franco-Prussian War

Sylvain-François Jules Merle de la Brugière, comte de Laveaucoupet (28 April 1806 in Saint-Sulpice-le-Dunois, Creuse – 18 May 1892) was a French general.

== Life ==
He was the son of Sylvie de la Celle and her husband François Merle de la Brugière, émigré and soldier in the armée of Condé. François became a captain on the Bourbon Restoration.

In 1814 he was admitted to La Flèche, then to Saint-Cyr in 1824, and received one of the honorary sabres granted by Charles X to the fifteen top graduates of Saint-Cyr. Made a sous-lieutenant in the 34th regiment of the line, he took part in the conquest of Algeria and on his father's advice swore to obey the new constitution of 1830. He returned to Algeria in 1836 as aide-de-camp to general Trézel, with whom he participated in the 1836 Constantine expedition. For his conduct on that campaign and for saving general Trézel after the latter was wounded by a musket-ball, he was decorated with the Légion d’honneur.

Punishing the popular revolt of 15 September 1841 at Clermont-Ferrand, many people demanded his promotion but this was refused by Louis-Philippe of France due to his belonging to an Ultra-royalist family. A candidate for the deputation of 1848, he was not elected, though he rose to colonel in 1851. In the Italian campaign he was chef d’état-major of the Motte-Rouge division of the 2nd Army Corps under the orders of Mac-Mahon. He was wounded in the fighting at Turbigo, then at the battle of Magenta.

Made a general on 28 February 1868, he received the command of the 3rd division of 2nd Corps in 1870. On 2 August 1870 he and Bataille were charged with a reconnaissance which led to the battle of Sarrebruck. He fought at the battle of Spicheren on 6 August then retreated to Metz, which surrendered on 28 October, leaving Laveaucoupet a prisoner. When he returned to France he was recalled by the National Assembly of 1871. He fought in the last battles and in the raising of the Montmartre butte on 28 May 1871 during the Commune of Paris in 1871. He was called as a witness at the trial of Bazaine.

== Distinctions ==
- Comm. LH 24/09/53, GC LH 19 juin 1871.

== Bibliography ==
- (in French) M de la Faye : Cinquante ans de vie militaire : Le général de Laveaucoupet
