= 74th (1st Hannover) Infantry =

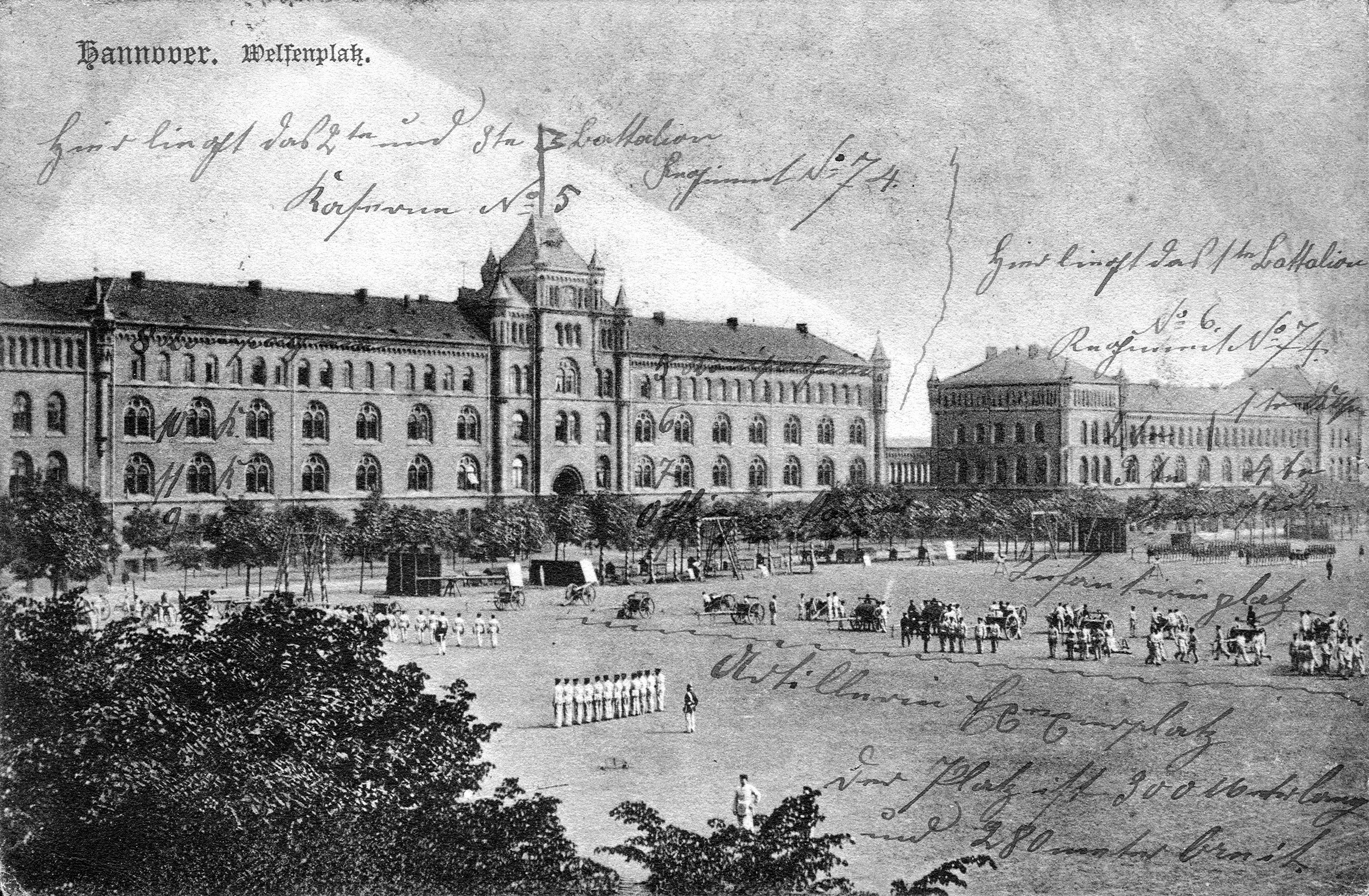
- Soldiers of the 1. Hannoverschen Infanterie-Regiments Nr. 74 in 1898 on the Welfenplatz in Hannover
- Active: September 1866 - January 1919
- Country: Prussia; German Empire
- Allegiance: Prussian Army; German Imperial Army
- Branch: Infantry
- Type: Regiment
- Garrison/HQ: Hannover
- Engagements: Franco-Prussian War: Battle of Spicheren; World War I

The 74st (1st Hannover) Infantry Regiment, or 1. Hannoversches Infanterie-Regiment Nr. 74, was an infantry regiment of the Prussian Army (1866 to 1871) and the German Imperial Army (1871 to 1918).

== Legacy ==
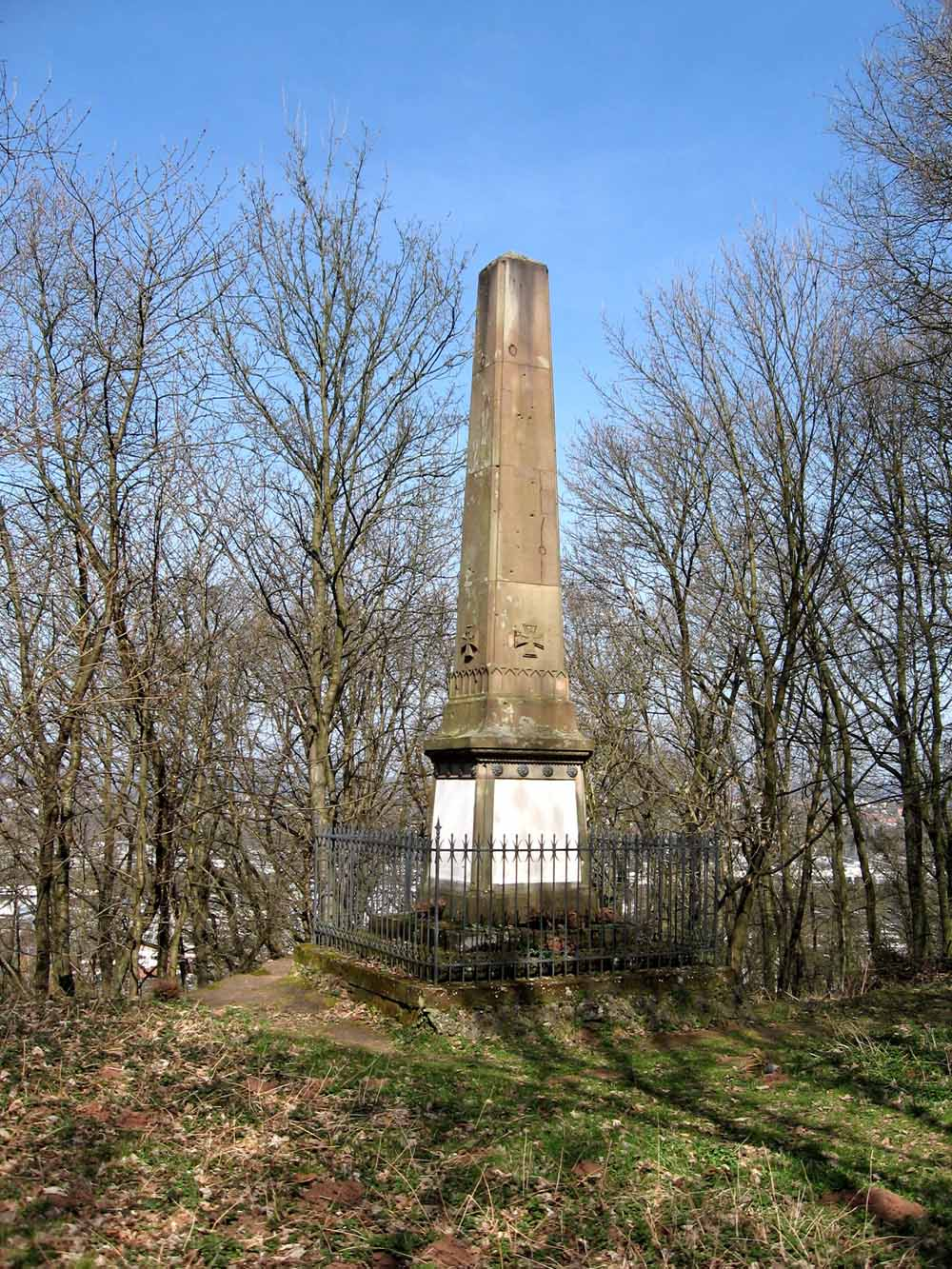
Memorial for the regiment's participation in the Battle of Spicheren.

The 74th fought in the Franco-Prussian War and distinguished itself during the Battle of Spicheren. Later it served in World War I.

After the war, when the German Imperial Army was dissolved, the regiment was perpetuated in the Reichswehr by 6. Kompanie/16. Infanterie-Regiment (6. Division, based in Münster).

A regimental veterans organisation, the Kameradschaft ehemaliger 74er, Hamburg und Umgebung was founded in 1912. The Kameradschaftliche Vereinigungen d. ehemal. 1. Hann. Inf.-Reg. Nr 74 published a regimental history in 1931.

== See also ==
- List of Imperial German infantry regiments

== Bibliography ==
- Funck, Hans. Offizier-Stammliste des vormaligen Königlich Hannoverschen 3. Infanterie-Regiments und des 1. Hannoverschen Infanterie-Regiments Nr. 74. Hannover: Rechts-, Staats- und Sozialwiss. Verl., 1913.
- Funck, Hans. Offizier-Stammliste des vormaligen Königlich Hannoverschen 3. Infanterie-Regiments und des 1. Hannoverschen Infanterie-Regiments Nr. 74. Hannover: Rechts-, Staats- und Sozialwiss. Verl., 1936. (Erg. 2)
- Gabriel, Kurt. Das 1. Hannoversche Infanterie-Regiment Nr 74 im Weltkriege. Hannover: Beeck, 1931.
- Zur Nedden, August. Geschichte des I. Hannoverschen Infanterie-Regiments Nr 74 und des vormaligen Königlich Hannoverschen 3. Infanterie-Regiments : 1813 bis 1903. Berlin: Mittler, 1903.
