= Kleny =

Kleny (Russian: Клены) or Klyony (Клёны) is the name of several inhabited localities in Russia.

Urban localities

- Kleny (urban-type settlement), Saratov Oblast, a work settlement under the administrative jurisdiction of the town of oblast significance of Volsk in Saratov Oblast

Rural localities

- Kleny, Rostov Oblast, a settlement in Gigantovskoye Rural Settlement of Salsky District in Rostov Oblast
- Kleny (rural locality), Saratov Oblast, a rural locality classified as a railway station under the administrative jurisdiction of the town of oblast significance of Volsk in Saratov Oblast
