= Václavice =

- Municipality
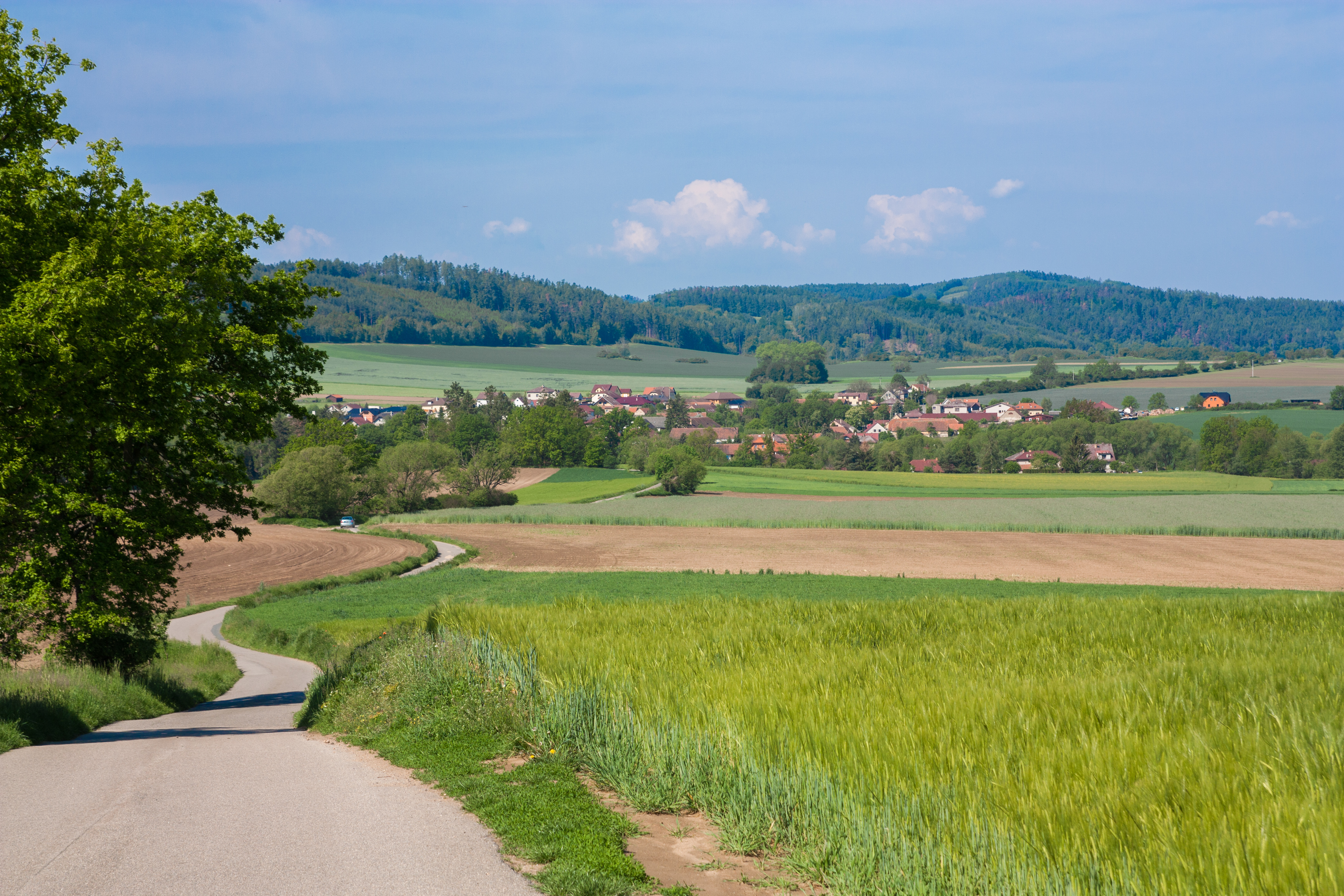
- General view

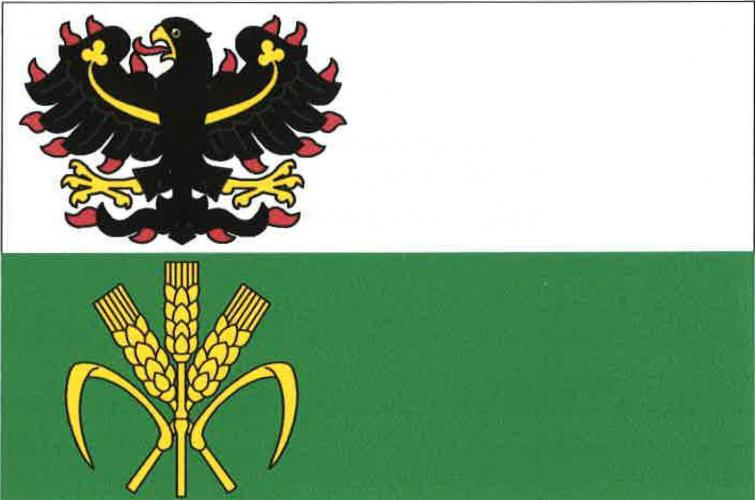
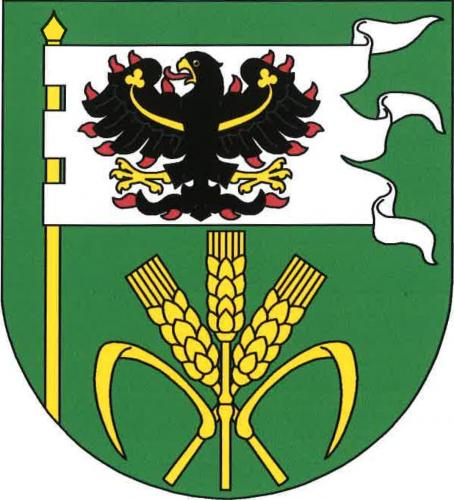
- Flag Coat of arms

- Location in the Czech Republic
- Coordinates: 49°47′22″N 14°36′49″E
- Country: Czech Republic
- Region: Central Bohemian
- District: Benešov
- First mentioned: 1271

Area
  - Total: 8.25 km^{2} (3.19 sq mi)
- Elevation: 295 m (968 ft)

Population (2026-01-01)
  - Total: 645
  - Density: 78.2/km^{2} (202/sq mi)
- Time zone: UTC+1 (CET)
  - Summer (DST): UTC+2 (CEST)
- Postal code: 256 01
- Website: www.vaclavice.com

Václavice is a municipality and village in Benešov District in the Central Bohemian Region of the Czech Republic. It has about 600 inhabitants.

== Administrative division ==
Václavice consists of three municipal parts (in brackets population according to the 2021 census):

- Václavice (420)
- Vatěkov (111)
- Zbožnice (86)

== Etymology ==
The initial name of the village of Vladislavice. It was derived from the personal name Vladislav, meaning "the village of Vladislav's people". In the 15th century, the name was distorted to Vadslavice. Due to the similarity with the name Václav, the name Václavice soon evolved.

== Geography ==
Václavice is located about 5 kilometres (3 mi) west of Benešov and 29 km (18 mi) south of Prague. It lies in the Benešov Uplands. The highest point is the hill Prostřední vrch at 404 m (1,325 ft) above sea level. The stream Janovický potok flows through the municipality. The municipal territory is rich in small streams.

== History ==
The first written mention of Václavice (as Vladislavice) is from 1271, when Queen Kunigunde donated the village to the Knights of the Cross with the Red Star. Zbožnice (initially known as Lhota Zbožná) was first mentioned in 1342. Vatěkov was first mentioned in 1386.

== Demographics ==
Historical population

Year	Pop.	±%
1869	640	—
1880	650	+1.6%
1890	662	+1.8%
1900	646	−2.4%
1910	609	−5.7%

Year	Pop.	±%
1921	540	−11.3%
1930	522	−3.3%
1950	411	−21.3%
1961	416	+1.2%
1970	422	+1.4%

Year	Pop.	±%
1980	423	+0.2%
1991	456	+7.8%
2001	446	−2.2%
2011	551	+23.5%
2021	617	+12.0%

Source: Censuses

== Transport ==
There are no railways or major roads passing through the municipality.

== Sights ==
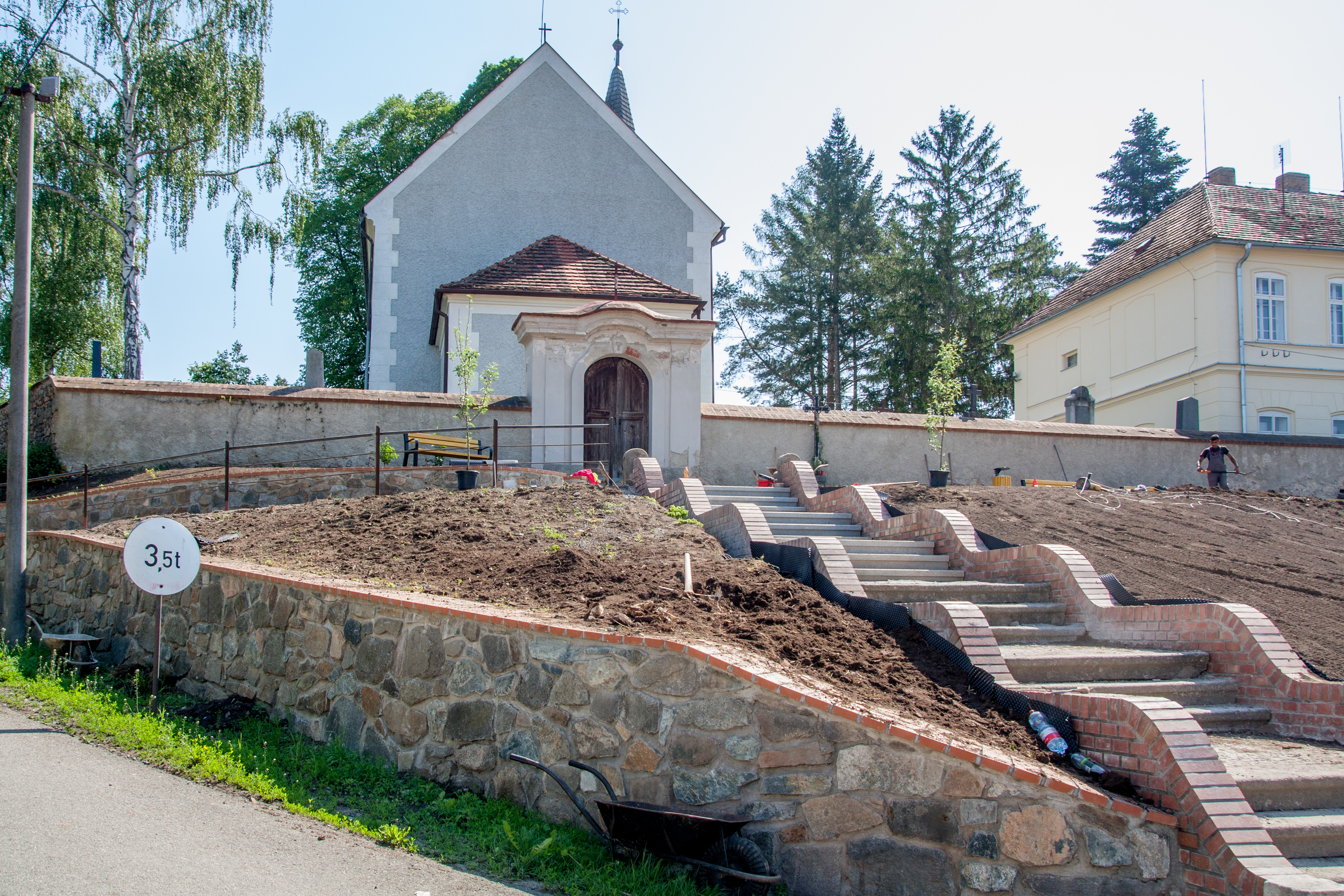
Church of Saint Wenceslaus

The main landmark of Václavice is the Church of Saint Wenceslaus. The core of the church was built in the early Gothic style at the end of the 13th century, but the church was then rebuilt several times.
