= Operation Alberich =

German withdrawal to the Hindenburg Line, 1917

Operation Alberich; (Unternehmen Alberich)
- Part of the Western Front of the First World War
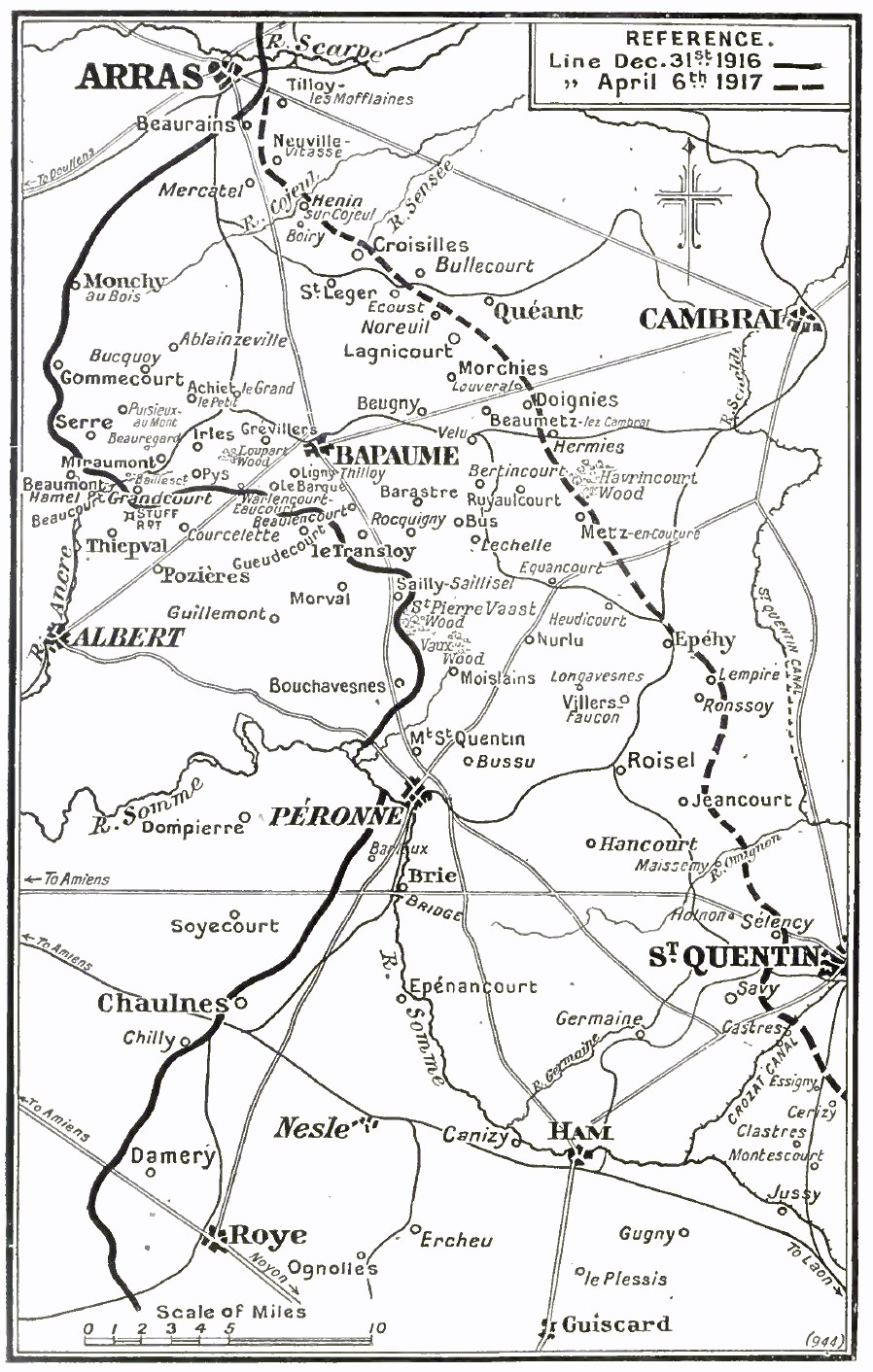
- New front line after Operation Alberich
Date	9 February – 20 March 1917
Location	Picardy, France 49°30′N 02°50′E
Result	German success
Territorial changes	Noyon and Bapaume salients abandoned

Belligerents
France; United Kingdom	Germany

Commanders and leaders
Robert Nivelle; Douglas Haig; Hubert Gough; Henry Rawlinson	Erich Ludendorff; (German Empire) Crown Prince Rupprecht; Fritz von Below

Operation Alberich
- Part of the Western Front
- Type: Strategic withdrawal
- Location: Noyon and Bapaume salients
- Planned: 1916–1917
- Planned by: Field Marshal Rupprecht von Bayern
- Commanded by: Quartermaster-General Erich Ludendorff
- Objective: Retirement to the Hindenburg Line
- Date: 9 February 1917 – 20 March 1917
- Executed by: Army Group Rupprecht of Bavaria
- Outcome: Success

Operation Alberich (German: Unternehmen Alberich) was the code name of a German military operation in France during the First World War. (Note: In Wagner's opera cycle Der Ring des Nibelungen, Alberich, the chief of the Nibelungen, a race of dwarfs, is an antagonist.) Two salients had been formed during the Battle of the Somme in 1916 between Arras and Saint-Quentin and from Saint-Quentin to Noyon. Alberich was planned as a strategic withdrawal to new positions on the shorter and more easily defended Hindenburg Line (Siegfriedstellung).

General Erich Ludendorff was reluctant to order the withdrawal and hesitated until the last moment. The retirement took place between 9 February and 20 March 1917, after months of preparation. The German retreat shortened the Western front by 25 mi (40 km). The withdrawal to the chord of the Bapaume and Noyon salients provided 13 to 14 extra divisions for the German strategic reserve, that was being assembled to defend the Aisne front against the Franco-British Nivelle Offensive, preparations for which were barely concealed.

== Background ==
=== Winter 1916–1917 ===
Soon after taking over from General der Infanterie Erich von Falkenhayn as head of the Supreme Army Command (Oberste Heeresleitung, OHL) at the end of August 1916, Generalfeldmarshall Paul von Hindenburg and his deputy General der Infanterie Erich Ludendorff, the Erster Generalquartiermeister (First Quartermaster General) ordered the building of a new defensive line, east of the Somme battlefront, from Arras to Laon. Ludendorff was unsure as to whether retreating to the Siegfriedstellung (Hindenburg Line) was desirable since it might diminish the morale of German soldiers and civilians.

An offensive was considered as an alternative if enough reserves could be assembled in the New Year and a staff study suggested that seventeen divisions might be made available, far too few to have decisive effect in the west. Alternatives, such as a shorter withdrawal, were also canvassed but the lack of manpower made the decision to retire unavoidable, since even with reinforcements from the Eastern Front, the German army in the west (Westheer) had only 154 divisions against 190 Allied divisions, many of which were larger. A move back to the Hindenburg Line (Siegfriedstellung) would shorten the front by 25–28 mi (40–45 km) and require 13 to 14 fewer divisions to hold.

=== German debates ===
German army thinking about a withdrawal to the Siegfriedstellung changed during the winter of 1916–1917 and comprised positive and negative reasons. At first it was seen by OHL as a last resort, if pressure on the Somme front became overwhelming. After the Central Powers' success in the Battle of Bucharest (28 November – 6 December 1916) and the beginning of the winter lull in France, optimism at OHL that the retreat was unnecessary rose but was then deflated by the French attack at Verdun on 15 December. During January 1917 the resumption of unrestricted U-boat warfare on 1 February 1917 offered the possibility of driving Britain out of the war. To win in the west, the German armies would need only to avoid defeat but a retirement to the Siegfriedstellung would give the Westheer a big defensive advantage.

A move back to the Siegfriedstellung would generate reserves by shortening the front and the defensive strength of the new positions, that were built in depth, on reverse slopes, behind wide belts of barbed wire and studded with machine-gun nests, would allow divisions to hold a wider frontage. Before the British and French could attack the new defences, they would have to rebuild the communications between the Somme and the Siegfriedstellung, that had been destroyed by the Germans before the retirement. The Germans planned to waste the land, with villages demolished, bridges blown, roads and railways dug up, wells tainted and the population carried off. The Franco–British armies would have to repeat the preparations for another offensive, after the retirement made preparations to resume the offensive on the Somme redundant. Every day's delay of an Entente offensive in France gave more time for the U-boat offensive to work and even if the Franco–British managed to attack, the Westheer expected to defeat the attempt.

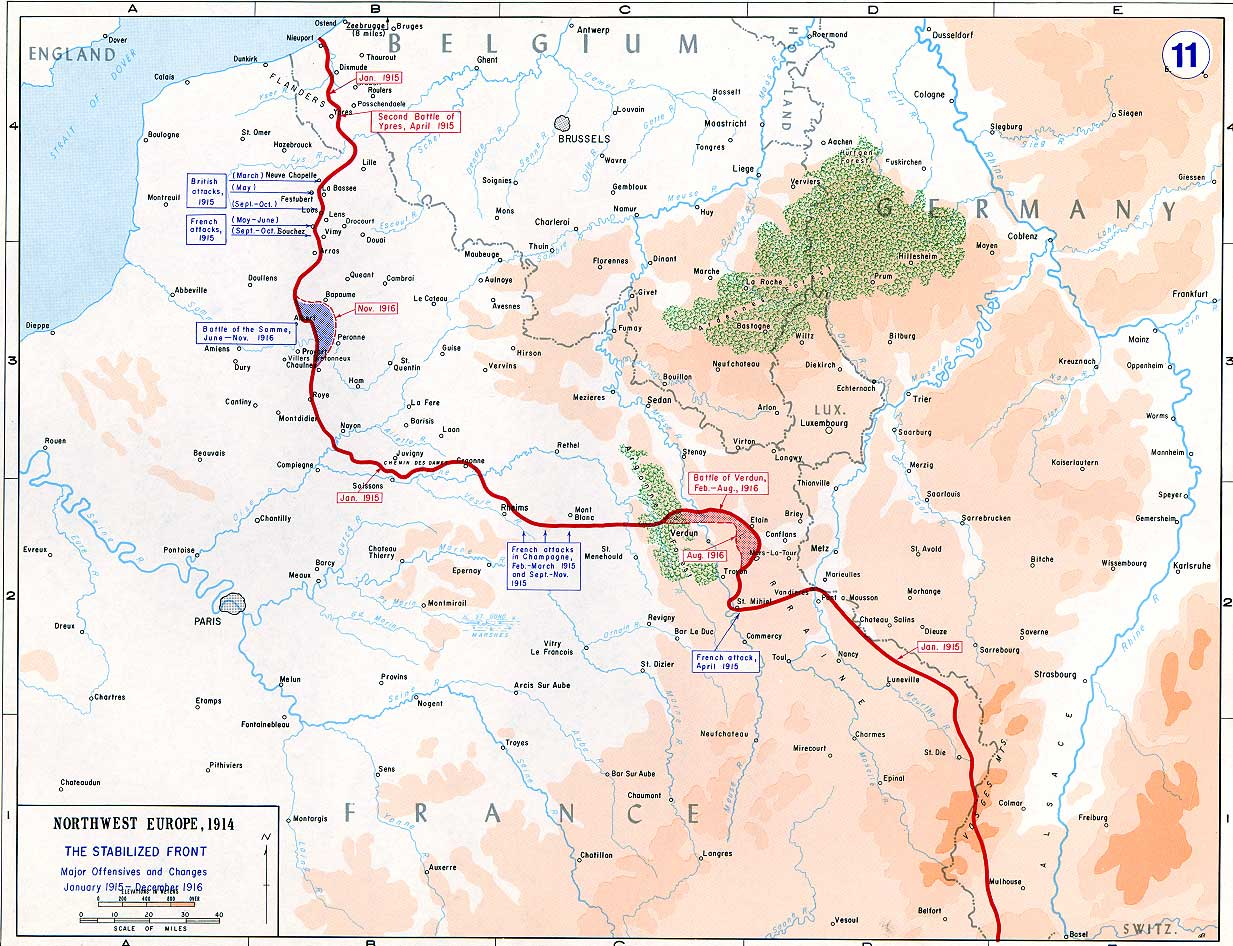
Western Front 1915–1916, with the Somme battlefront in blue

General der Infanterie Fritz von Below, the commander of the 1st Army (1. Armee/Armeeoberkommando 1/A.O.K. 1), had opposed a withdrawal to avoid a blow to the morale of the men who had fought to defend the Somme front. Subordinate commanders on the Somme doubted the ability of their men to withstand another offensive. The commander of the XIV Reserve Corps, Generalleutnant Georg Fuchs, reported that morale was low and that the defences were in a deplorable state, positions near the Ancre being nothing more than flooded shell holes. Hermann von Kuhl, the chief of staff of Army Group Rupprecht of Bavaria (Heeresgruppe Kronprinz Rupprecht) was persuaded by Fuchs and others to advocate a move back to the Siegfriedstellung. On 4 February, Kaiser Wilhelm II ordered that the intervening ground be devastated and the retirement to begin on 9 February. Below and the 2nd Army commander, General der Kavallerie Georg von der Marwitz (since 17 December 1916) had been overruled by a consensus of their commanders and subordinates.

== Prelude ==
=== Crown Prince Rupprecht ===
Rupprecht, Crown Prince of Bavaria, the commander of Heeresgruppe Kronprinz Rupprecht, comprising the 1st Army, 2nd Army, 6th Army and the 7th Army (from the Somme front to Flanders) had preferred a deeper retreat to fortifications incorporating cities like Lille and Cambrai to deter an Entente attack. OHL judged this impractical for lack of manpower. Rupprecht also opposed the intention to turn the ground in the Noyon Salient into a wasteland when the final demolitions to scorch the earth began on 16 March because of the damage to the prestige of the German Empire and the deleterious effects on the discipline of his troops. The demolitions made a desert of 580 sq mi (1,500 km^{2}) of territory and Rupprecht contemplated resignation, then relented, for fear that it might suggest a rift between Bavaria and the rest of Germany.

=== Operations on the Ancre ===
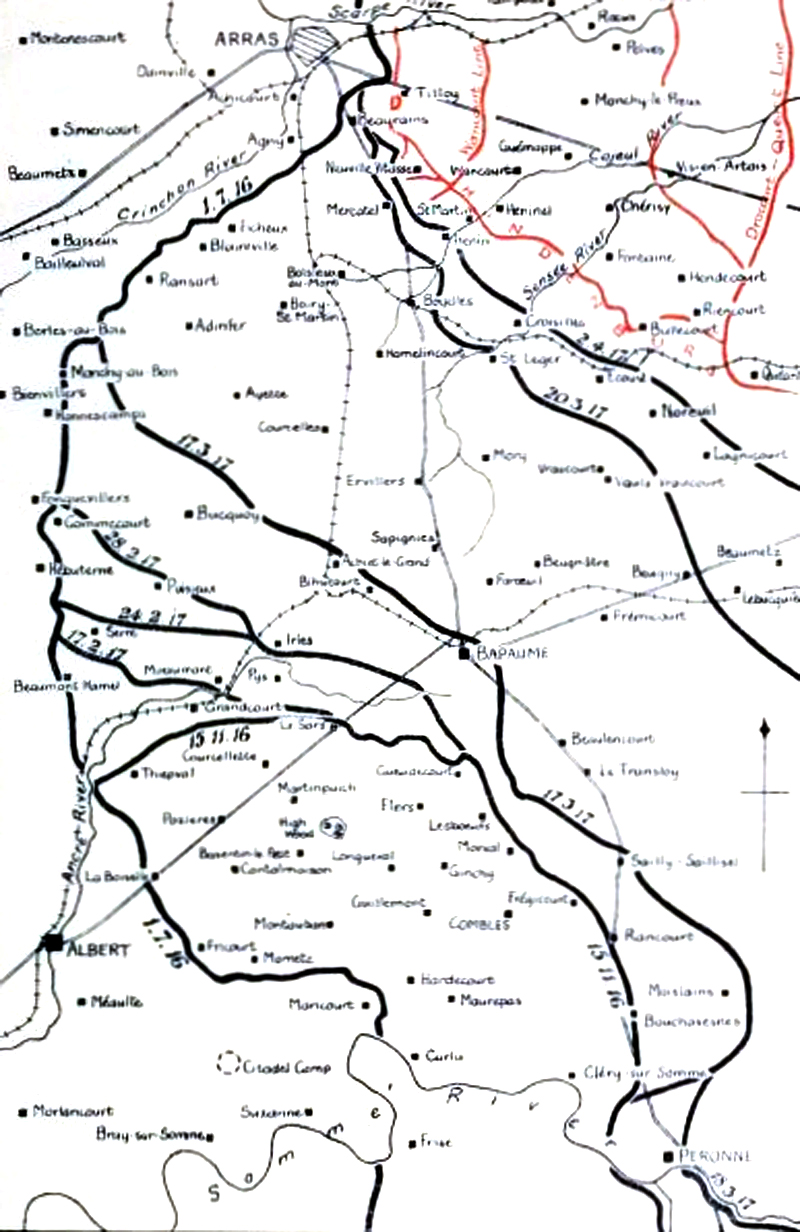
German retirements on the Somme, January–March 1917

From 11 January to 13 March 1917, the British Fifth Army attacked the German 1st Army positions in the Ancre river valley, on the northern flank of the Somme battlefield of 1916. The Action of Miraumont (17–18 February), Capture of the Thilloys (25 February – 2 March) and the Capture of Irles (10 March) took place before the main German withdrawal began. British attacks had taken place against exhausted German troops holding poor defensive positions left over from the fighting in 1916. Some German troops had low morale and showed an unusual willingness to surrender. British attacks in the Action of Miraumont and anticipation of further attacks led Rupprecht on 18 March to order a withdrawal.

The 1st Army withdrew about 3 mi (4.8 km) on a 15 mi (24 km) front to the Riegel I Stellung from Essarts to Le Transloy on 22 February. The retirement caused some surprise to the British despite the interception of wireless messages from 20 to 21 February. A second German withdrawal took place on 11 March, during a preparatory British bombardment and was not noticed by the British until the night of 12/13 March. Patrols found Riegel I Stellung empty between Bapaume and Achiet-le-Petit and strongly held on either flank. A British attack on Bucquoy at the north end of Riegel I Stellung on the night of 13/14 March was a costly failure. German withdrawals on the Ancre spread south, beginning with a retirement from the salient around St Pierre Vaast Wood.

== Unternehmen Alberich ==
=== German withdrawal ===
Alberich began on 9 February 1917 in the area to be abandoned. Railways and roads were dug up, trees were felled, water wells were polluted, towns and villages were demolished and many land mines and other booby traps were planted. About 125,000 able-bodied French civilians in the region were transported to work elsewhere in occupied France, while children, mothers and the elderly were left behind with minimal rations. On 4 March, Général Louis Franchet d'Espèrey, the commander of Groupe d'armées du Nord (Northern Army Group, GAN) advocated an attack while the Germans were preparing to retreat. The withdrawal took place from 16 to 20 March, with a retirement of about 25 mi (40 km), giving up more French territory than had been gained by the Allies from September 1914 until the beginning of the operation.

=== British operations ===
During the German withdrawal, the British Third Army and Fifth Army followed up and conducted the Capture of Bapaume, 1917 (17 March) and the Occupation of Péronne (18 March).

== Aftermath ==
=== Analysis ===
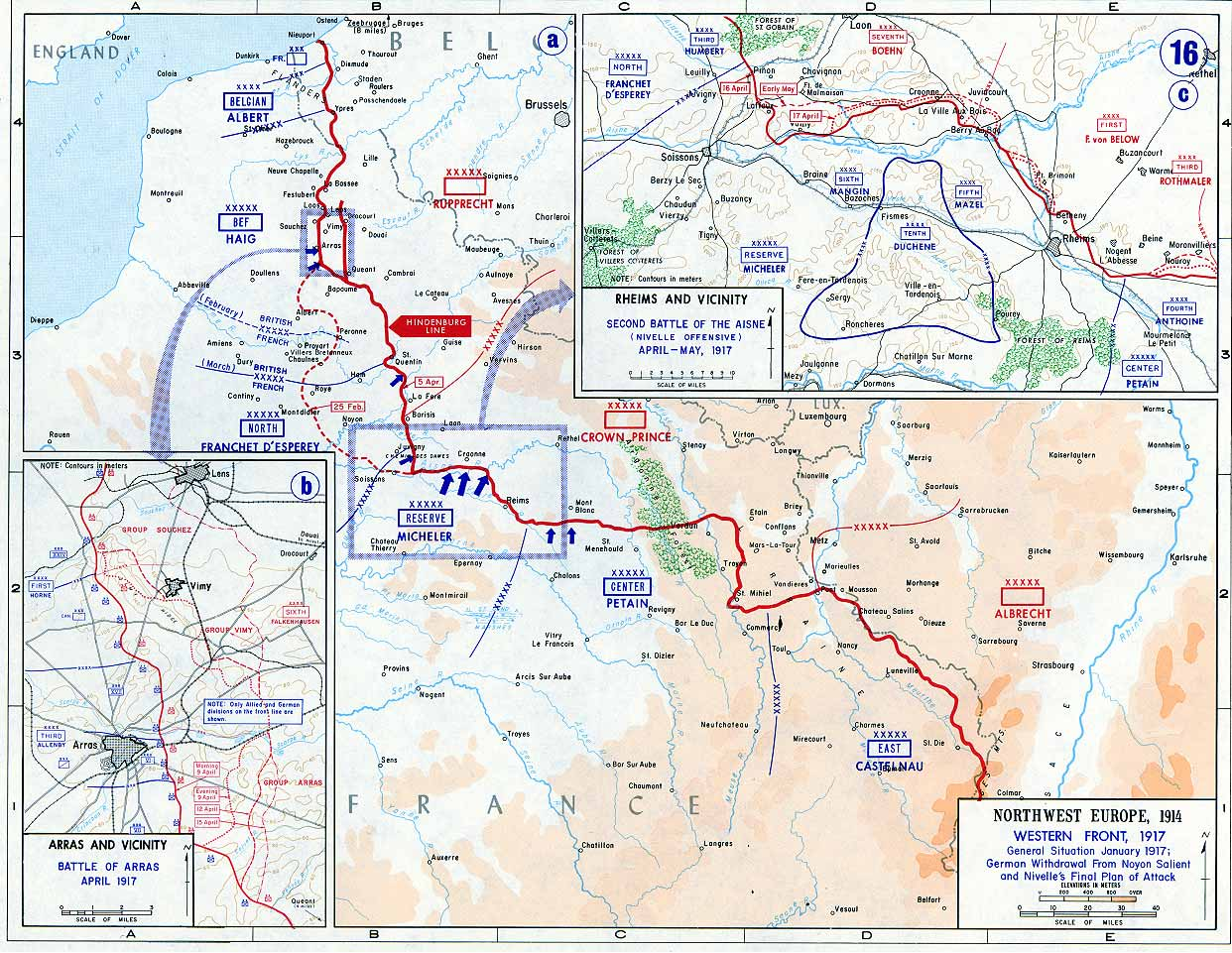
Map of the Western Front after Operation Alberich, 1917

By evacuating the Noyon and Bapaume salients, the Germans shortened their front by 25 mi (40 km). Fourteen fewer German divisions were needed for line holding and Allied plans for their spring offensive were seriously disrupted. The operation is considered to have been a propaganda disaster for Germany because of the scorched-earth policy but is also thought to be one of the shrewdest defensive operations of the war. During periods of fine weather in October 1916, British reconnaissance flights had reported new defences being built far behind the Somme front. On 9 November a formation of eight photographic reconnaissance aircraft and eight escorts reported a new line of defences from Bourlon Wood north to Quéant, Bullecourt, the Sensée, Héninel and the German third line near Arras. Two other lines closer to the front were observed as they were dug (Riegel I Stellung and Riegel II Stellung) from Ablainzevelle to the west of Bapaume and Roquigny, with a branch from Achiet-le-Grand to Beugny and Ytres.

In 2004, James Beach wrote that some authorities hold that British aerial reconnaissance failed to detect the construction of the Hindenburg Line or the German preparations for the troop withdrawal. Evidence of German intentions was collected but German deception caused unremarkable information to be gleaned from intermittent air reconnaissance. Frequent bad flying weather over the winter and the precedent of new German defences being built behind existing fortifications during the Battle of the Somme led British military intelligence to misinterpret the information. In late December 1916, reports from witnesses led the British and French to send air reconnaissance sorties further to the south. In mid-January 1917, British intelligence concluded that a new line was being built from Arras to Laon. By February, the line was known to be near completion and by 25 February, local withdrawals on the British Fifth Army front in the Ancre valley and prisoner interrogations, led the British to anticipate a gradual German withdrawal to the new line.

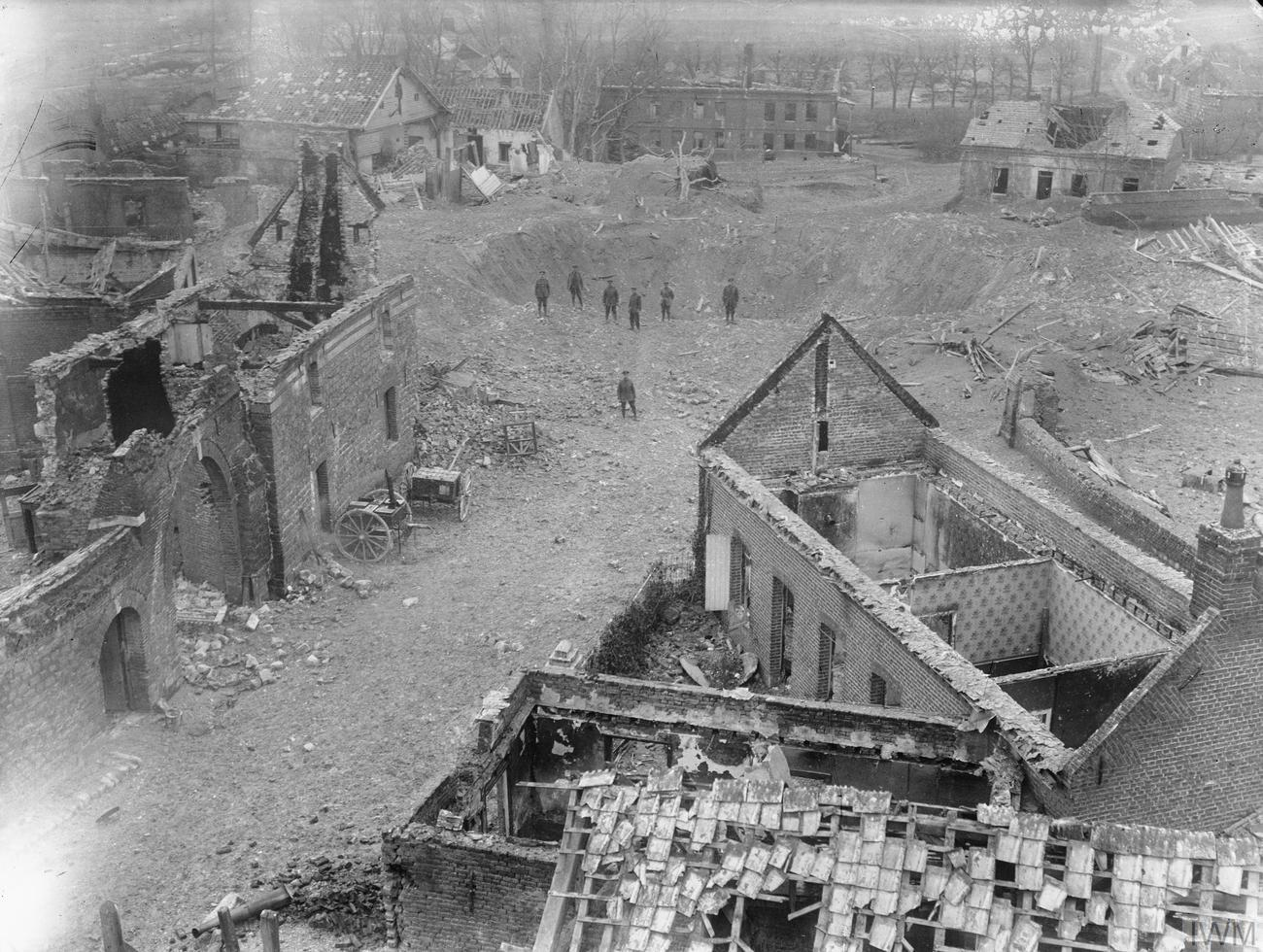
Mine crater in the road through Athies, Pas-de-Calais, to impede the British follow-up

The first intimation of a German withdrawal occurred when British patrols, probing German outposts towards Serre, found them to be unoccupied. The British began a slow follow-up but unpreparedness, the decrepitude of the local roads and the German advantage of falling back on prepared lines, behind rearguards of machine-gunners, meant that the Germans were able to complete an orderly withdrawal. The new defences were built on reverse slopes, with positions behind the defences from which artillery observers could see the front position, experience having showed that infantry equipped with machine-guns needed a field of fire only a few hundred yards/meters deep. Unfortunately for the Germans, General Ludwig von Lauter and Colonel Kramer from OHL ignored the new thinking on defensive fortification; in much of the new position, they had put artillery observation posts in the front line or in front of it and the front position on forward slopes, near crests or at the rear of long reverse slopes.
