= Eulitz =

Eulitz is a surname. Notable people with the surname include:

- Hans von Eulitz (1866–1945), Saxon Army officer
- Marianne Burkert-Eulitz (born 1972), German politician

== See also ==
- Eulima
