= XVIII Reserve Corps =

XVIII Reserve Corps XVIII. Reserve-Korps
- Flag of the Staff of a Generalkommando (1871–1918)
- Active: 2 August 1914 - post November 1918
- Country: German Empire
- Type: Corps
- Size: Approximately 38,000 (on formation)
- Engagements: World War I Battle of the Frontiers

Insignia
- Abbreviation: XVIII RK

The XVIII Reserve Corps (German: XVIII. Reserve-Korps / XVIII RK) was a corps level command of the German Army in World War I.

== Formation ==
XVIII Reserve Corps was formed on the outbreak of the war in August 1914 as part of the mobilisation of the Army. It was initially commanded by Generalleutnant Kuno von Steuben, formerly of the Prussian War Academy. It was still in existence at the end of the war in the 18th Army, Heeresgruppe Deutscher Kronprinz on the Western Front.

=== Structure on formation ===
On formation in August 1914, XVIII Reserve Corps consisted of two divisions, made up of reserve units. In general, Reserve Corps and Reserve Divisions were weaker than their active counterparts

Reserve Infantry Regiments did not always have three battalions nor necessarily contain a machine gun company
Reserve Jäger Battalions did not have a machine gun company on formation
Reserve Cavalry Regiments consisted of just three squadrons
Reserve Field Artillery Regiments usually consisted of two abteilungen of three batteries each
Corps Troops generally consisted of a Telephone Detachment and four sections of munition columns and trains

In summary, XVIII Reserve Corps mobilised with 24 infantry battalions, 5 machine gun companies (30 machine guns), 6 cavalry squadrons, 12 field artillery batteries (72 guns) and 3 pioneer companies. It included one active Infantry Regiment (168th).

Corps	Division	Brigade	Units
XVIII Reserve Corps	21st Reserve Division	41st Reserve Infantry Brigade	80th Reserve Infantry Regiment
XVIII Reserve Corps	21st Reserve Division	41st Reserve Infantry Brigade	87th Reserve Infantry Regiment
XVIII Reserve Corps	21st Reserve Division	42nd Reserve Infantry Brigade	81st Reserve Infantry Regiment
XVIII Reserve Corps	21st Reserve Division	42nd Reserve Infantry Brigade	88th Reserve Infantry Regiment
XVIII Reserve Corps	21st Reserve Division		7th Reserve Dragoon Regiment
XVIII Reserve Corps	21st Reserve Division		21st Reserve Field Artillery Regiment
XVIII Reserve Corps	21st Reserve Division		4th Company, 11th Pioneer Battalion
XVIII Reserve Corps	21st Reserve Division		21st Reserve Divisional Pontoon Train
XVIII Reserve Corps	21st Reserve Division		17th Reserve Medical Company
XVIII Reserve Corps	25th Reserve Division	49th Reserve Infantry Brigade	116th Reserve Infantry Regiment
XVIII Reserve Corps	25th Reserve Division	49th Reserve Infantry Brigade	118th Reserve Infantry Regiment
XVIII Reserve Corps	25th Reserve Division	50th Reserve Infantry Brigade	168th Infantry Regiment
XVIII Reserve Corps	25th Reserve Division	50th Reserve Infantry Brigade	83rd Reserve Infantry Regiment
XVIII Reserve Corps	25th Reserve Division		4th Reserve Dragoon Regiment
XVIII Reserve Corps	25th Reserve Division		25th Reserve Field Artillery Regiment
XVIII Reserve Corps	25th Reserve Division		1st Reserve Company, 11th Pioneer Battalion
XVIII Reserve Corps	25th Reserve Division		2nd Reserve Company, 11th Pioneer Battalion
XVIII Reserve Corps	25th Reserve Division		25th Reserve Divisional Pontoon Train
XVIII Reserve Corps	25th Reserve Division		18th Reserve Medical Company
XVIII Reserve Corps	Corps Troops		18th Reserve Telephone Detachment
XVIII Reserve Corps	Corps Troops		Munition Trains and Columns corresponding to the III Reserve Corps

== Combat chronicle ==
On mobilisation, XVIII Reserve Corps was assigned to the 4th Army forming part of the centre of the forces for the Schlieffen Plan offensive in August 1914.

== Commanders ==
XVIII Reserve Corps had the following commanders during its existence:

From	Rank	Name
2 August 1914	Generalleutnant	Kuno von Steuben
19 August 1914	General der Infanterie	Kuno von Steuben
5 June 1917	Generalleutnant	Karl von Wenninger
11 September 1917	Generalleutnant	Ludwig Sieger

== See also ==
- German Army order of battle (1914)
- German Army order of battle, Western Front (1918)

== Bibliography ==
- Cron, Hermann (2002). Imperial German Army 1914-18: Organisation, Structure, Orders-of-Battle [first published: 1937]. Helion & Co. ISBN 1-874622-70-1.
- Ellis, John; Cox, Michael (1993). The World War I Databook. Aurum Press Ltd. ISBN 1-85410-766-6.
- Histories of Two Hundred and Fifty-One Divisions of the German Army which Participated in the War (1914-1918), compiled from records of Intelligence section of the General Staff, American Expeditionary Forces, at General Headquarters, Chaumont, France 1919. The London Stamp Exchange Ltd. 1989 [1920]. ISBN 0-948130-87-3.
- The German Forces in the Field; 7th Revision, 11th November 1918; Compiled by the General Staff, War Office. Imperial War Museum, London and the Battery Press. 1995 [1918]. ISBN 978-1-870423-95-3.
