= Hans von Guretzky-Cornitz =

Imperial German Army general (1855–1917)

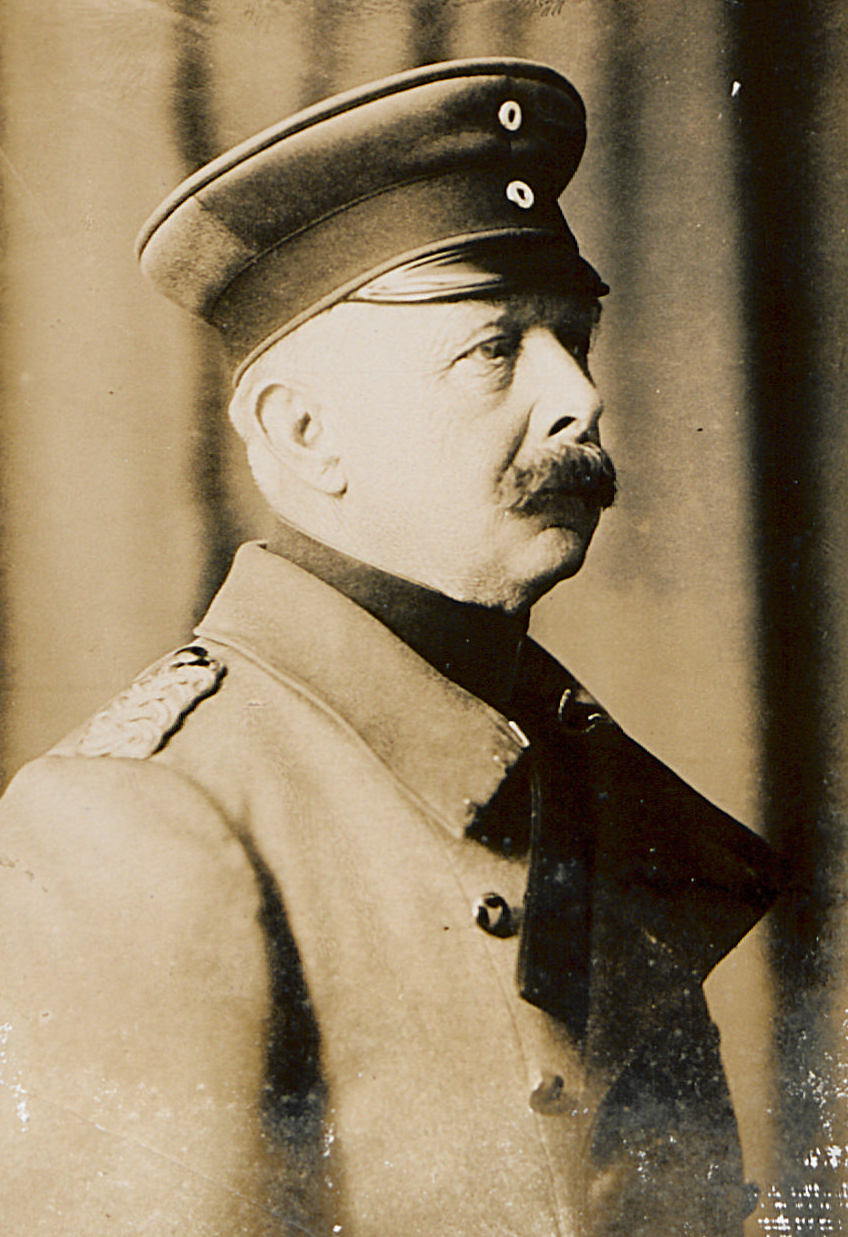
- Pictured in 1916
- Born: 10 August 1855; Fürstenwalde, Prussia
- Died: 27 July 1917 (aged 61); Aachen, German Empire
- Military career
- Allegiance: German Empire
- Rank: General of the Infantry
- Commands: 9th Reserve Division (1914-1917)
- Conflicts: First World War
- Awards: Pour le Mérite

Hans Karl Moritz von Guretzky-Cornitz (10 August 1855 – 27 July 1917) was a German army general. He served in the 4th (Queen Augusta) Guards Grenadiers before becoming, by 1904, chief of staff of the IX Army Corps. Guretzky-Cornitz was promoted to lieutenant-general in 1911 and from 1914, as a General of the Infantry, commanded the 9th Reserve Division. After service in the invasion of Belgium Guretzky-Cornitz's took part in the 1916 Battle of Verdun. He was awarded the Pour le Mérite after mistakenly claiming to have captured Fort Vaux. After further service in the Battle of the Somme and the Battle of Arras, Guretzky-Cornitz died in Aachen, Germany, while his division was enjoying a rest period.

== Early life and career ==
Guretzky-Cornitz was born in Fürstenwalde, Prussia, on 10 August 1855. He was the first son and second child of the Prussian cavalry general Karl Sigmund von Guretzky-Cornitz, and his wife Thekla von Selmnitz. On 11 October 1889 he married Antoinette von Restorff in Radegast, Saxony-Anhalt, which was her family's seat. By 1891 Guretzky-Cornitz was a captain and company commander in the 4th (Queen Augusta) Guards Grenadiers in the Prussian Army, which formed part of the Imperial German Army. By 1904 Guretzky-Cornitz was a colonel and chief of staff of the IX Army Corps. He was promoted to the rank of lieutenant-general on 21 April 1911.

== First World War ==
=== Early war ===
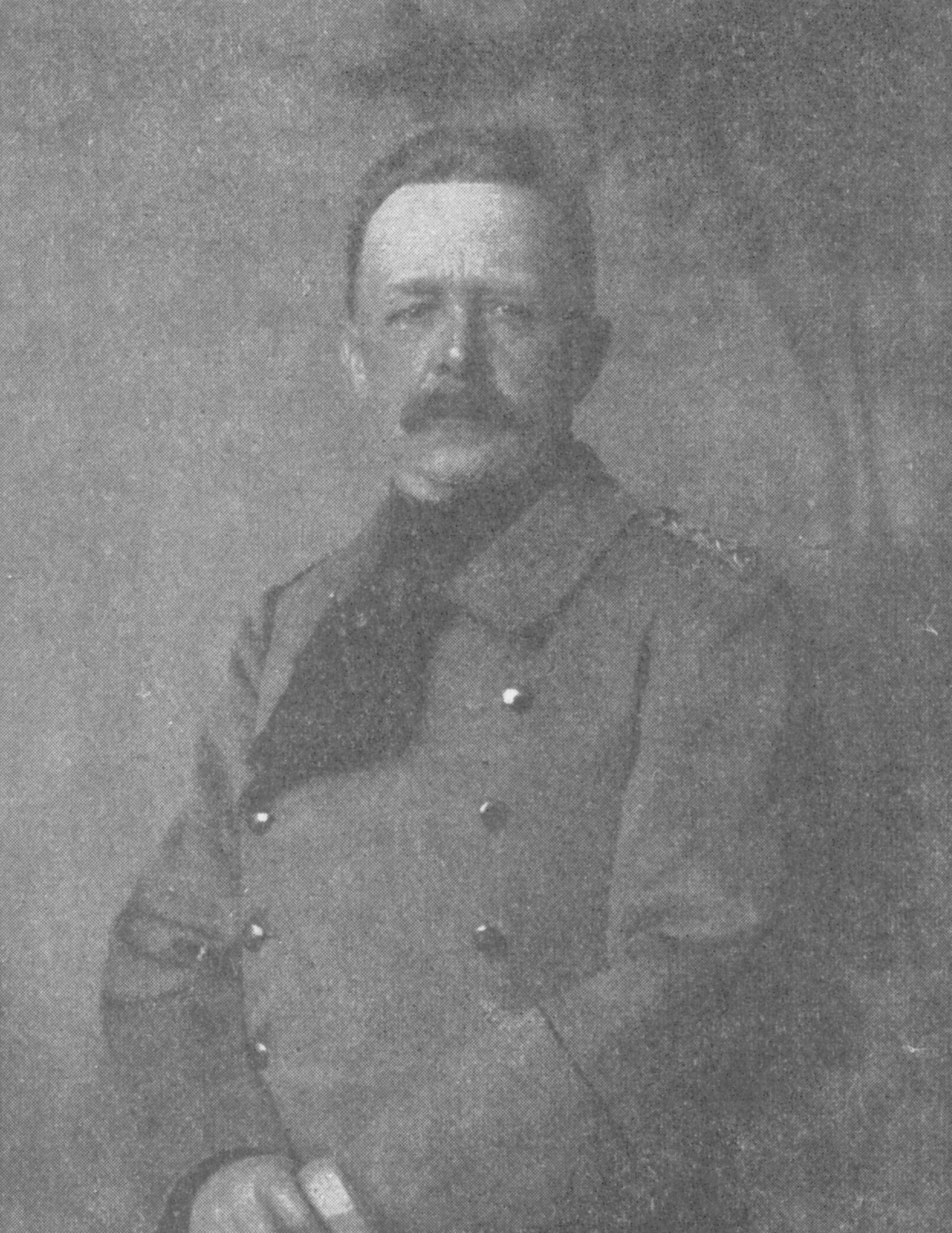
Pictured in 1914

During the early part of the First World War Guretzky-Cornitz commanded the 9th Reserve Division with the rank of General of the Infantry. As part of Crown Prince Wilhelm's 5th Army Guretzky-Cornitz's division participated in the invasion of Belgium and the Battle of the Ardennes. From January 1915 to February 1916 the division held the line from Gincrey to Warcq in the Meuse, France.

=== Verdun ===
The 9th Reserve Division from withdrawn from Meuse in February 1916 to participate in the German offensive that began the Battle of Verdun. At the start of March the division seized the village of Vaux-devant-Damloup from French troops. On 9 March Guretzky-Cornitz received reports that his troops had captured the key French fortification of Fort Vaux. It was believed that the French had abandoned the post as they did earlier at Fort Douaumont. The report had come from a forward infantry officer. The brigade commander raised doubts but apparent confirmation came from an artillery observer who reported seeing a German flag on the fort glacis and other observers reported sighting German troops at the fort with piled arms. The brigade artillery commander noted that this was unlikely but was ordered to cease firing on the fort immediately.

Guretzky-Cornitz sent a self-aggrandising report to the 5th Army headquarters, from which it was sent onwards without verification. The capture of Fort Vaux was notified to the world's press as a major victory. German Emperor Wilhelm II authorised the award of the Pour le Mérite to Guretzky-Cornitz for the success. Because of the importance of the victory 5th Army commander Crown Prince Wilhelm took the unusual step of driving immediately to Guretzky-Cornitz's headquarters to award the medal on 9 March.

A column of troops sent by Guretzky-Cornitz to occupy Fort Vaux found the defenders were still present. They were machine gunned as they marched over the glacis and suffered heavy casualties. The repulse was featured in French propaganda. A new German press release was made stating that following a French counter-attack they had taken a foothold in the fort once more. Despite the misleading report Guretzky-Cornitz was permitted to retain his decoration. The division was withdrawn from the line on 12 March and sent to recover; it returned to Verdun around 20 March to hold a defensive position but suffered heavy losses from artillery and was withdrawn again in April.

=== Later events ===
The 9th Reserve Division under Guretzky-Cornitz was deployed to Champagne on 20 June 1916, remaining there until September when it was deployed to the Battle of the Somme. At the Somme the division held a position near Bouchavesnes-Bergen with few casualties. It was withdrawn on 18 October but was deployed again on the Somme between December 1916 and March 1917. In May it was deployed near Monchy-le-Preux and fought in the Battle of Arras. Guretzky-Cornitz's division was withdrawn from Monchy in early June and deployed to Armentieres until mid-July when it was withdrawn for a period of rest and recovery. During this period Guretzky-Cornitz died on 27 July 1917 at Aachen, Rhine Province. The German Federal Military Archive at Freiburg im Breisgau holds a collection of his First World War papers.

== Bibliography ==
- Holstein, Christina (2012). Fort Vaux. Pen and Sword. ISBN 978-1-78303-235-8.
- Horne, Alistair (1981) [1964]. The Price of Glory: Verdun 1916 (Abridged ed.). Penguin. ISBN 978-0-14-002215-5.
