= 21st Reserve Division =

21st Reserve Division (21. Reserve-Division)
- Active: 1914-1919
- Country: Germany
- Branch: Army
- Type: Infantry
- Size: Approx. 15,000
- Engagements: World War I: Great Retreat, First Battle of the Marne, Battle of Verdun, Second Battle of the Aisne, Battle of Cambrai (1917), German spring offensive, Hundred Days Offensive, Second Battle of the Somme (1918)

The 21st Reserve Division (21. Reserve-Division) was a unit of the Imperial German Army during World War I. The division was formed upon mobilization of the German Army in August 1914 as part of XVIII Reserve Corps. The division was disbanded in 1919 during the demobilization of the German Army after World War I. The division was raised primarily in the Prussian Province of Hesse-Nassau, but one battalion of the 88th Reserve Infantry Regiment came from the Grand Duchy of Hesse, and some other troops of the division came from Westphalia and the Rhine Province.

== Combat chronicle ==
The 21st Reserve Division fought on the Western Front, participating in the opening German offensive which led to the Allied Great Retreat and ended with the First Battle of the Marne. Thereafter, the division remained in the line in the Champagne region until June 1916. In July 1916, the division entered the Battle of Verdun. It returned to the Champagne in September and then went back to Verdun in December 1916-January 1917. In the Spring of 1917, the division fought in the Second Battle of the Aisne, also known as the Third Battle of Champagne. In November 1917, the division saw action in the tank battle at Cambrai. The division participated in the 1918 German spring offensive. It faced the Allied Hundred Days Offensive, and fought in the Second Battle of the Somme (1918) (also called the Third Battle of the Somme). Allied intelligence rated the division as second class.

== Order of battle on mobilization ==
The order of battle of the 21st Reserve Division on mobilization was as follows:

- 41. Reserve-Infanterie-Brigade
  - Reserve-Infanterie-Regiment Nr. 80
  - Reserve-Infanterie-Regiment Nr. 87
- 42. Reserve-Infanterie-Brigade
  - Reserve-Infanterie-Regiment Nr. 81
  - Reserve-Infanterie-Regiment Nr. 88
- Reserve-Dragoner-Regiment Nr. 7
- Reserve-Feldartillerie-Regiment Nr. 21
- 4.Kompanie/Kurhessisches Pionier-Bataillon Nr. 11

== Order of battle on March 8, 1918 ==
The 21st Reserve Division was triangularized in October 1916. Over the course of the war, other changes took place, including the formation of artillery and signals commands and a pioneer battalion. The order of battle on March 8, 1918, was as follows:

- 41. Reserve-Infanterie-Brigade
  - Reserve-Infanterie-Regiment Nr. 80
  - Reserve-Infanterie-Regiment Nr. 87
  - Reserve-Infanterie-Regiment Nr. 88
- 3.Eskadron/Reserve-Dragoner-Regiment Nr. 4
- Artillerie-Kommandeur 126
  - Reserve-Feldartillerie-Regiment Nr. 21
  - Kgl. Bayerisches Fußartillerie-Bataillon Nr. 22
- Stab Pionier-Bataillon Nr. 321
  - 4.Kompanie/Kurhessisches Pionier-Bataillon Nr. 11
  - 5.Kompanie/Kurhessisches Pionier-Bataillon Nr. 11
  - Minenwerfer-Kompanie Nr. 221
- Divisions-Nachrichten-Kommandeur 421
