= 25th Reserve Division =

Unit of the Imperial German Army in World War I

25th Reserve Division (25. Reserve-Division)
- Active: 1914–1918
- Country: Germany
- Branch: Army
- Type: Infantry
- Size: Approx. 15,000
- Engagements: World War I: Great Retreat, First Battle of the Marne, Race to the Sea, Gorlice-Tarnów Offensive, Serbian campaign, Battle of Verdun, Battle of Cantigny, Hundred Days Offensive, Somme Offensive

The 25th Reserve Division (25. Reserve-Division) was a unit of the Imperial German Army, in World War I. The division was formed on mobilization of the German Army in August 1914 as part of XVIII Reserve Corps and was disbanded in October 1918, with its assets being distributed to other units. The division was raised in the Grand Duchy of Hesse and the Prussian Province of Hesse-Nassau, while its 83rd Reserve Infantry Regiment included troops from the Principality of Waldeck.

== Combat chronicle ==
The 25th Reserve Division began World War I on the Western Front, fighting through Belgium and France in what became known as the Allied Great Retreat, culminating in the First Battle of the Marne. It then participated in the Race to the Sea, fighting in Flanders and the Artois, including at Lille. In December 1914, it was sent to the Eastern Front. In 1915, it participated in the Gorlice-Tarnów Offensive, including the battles at Lemberg (now Lviv) and Brest-Litovsk. It then fought in the Serbian campaign. After this campaign, the division was transferred from Macedonia back to the Western Front. After several months' fighting in the Argonne Forest, the division entered the Battle of Verdun in July 1916, where it suffered heavy losses. It also faced the French offensive in August 1917 at Verdun, where it again suffered heavy losses. In 1918, the division faced Allied offensives at the Battle of Cantigny, Montdidier and Noyon, and in the Somme Offensive, again taking heavy losses. The division was dissolved on 20 October 1918. Until 1918, Allied intelligence rated the division as second class, but downgraded it based on its use by the German high command and performance in battle.

== Order of battle on mobilization ==
The order of battle of the 25th Reserve Division on mobilization was as follows:

- 49. Reserve-Infanterie-Brigade
  - Großherzoglich Hessisches Reserve-Infanterie-Regiment Nr. 116
  - Großherzoglich Hessisches Reserve-Infanterie-Regiment Nr. 118
- 50. Reserve-Infanterie-Brigade
  - 5. Großherzoglich Hessisches Infanterie-Regiment Nr. 168
  - Kurhessisches Reserve-Infanterie-Regiment Nr. 83
- Reserve-Dragoner-Regiment Nr. 4
- Großherzoglich Hessisches Reserve-Feldartillerie-Regiment Nr. 25
- 1. Reserve-Kompanie/Kurhessisches Pionier-Bataillon Nr. 11
- 2. Reserve-Kompanie/Kurhessisches Pionier-Bataillon Nr. 11

== Order of battle on 13 February 1918 ==
The 25th Reserve Division was triangularized in May 1915. Over the course of the war, other changes took place, including the formation of artillery and signals commands and a pioneer battalion. The order of battle on 13 February 1918 was as follows:

- 50. Reserve-Infanterie-Brigade
  - Kurhessisches Reserve-Infanterie-Regiment Nr. 83
  - Großherzoglich Hessisches Reserve-Infanterie-Regiment Nr. 118
  - 5. Großherzoglich Hessisches Infanterie-Regiment Nr. 168
- 2.Eskadron/Reserve-Dragoner-Regiment Nr. 4
- Artillerie-Kommandeur 127
  - Großherzoglich Hessisches Reserve-Feldartillerie-Regiment Nr. 25
  - II.Bataillon/Reserve-Fußartillerie-Regiment Nr. 15 (from 27 April 1918)
- Stab Kurhessisches Pionier-Bataillon Nr. 11
  - 1. Reserve-Kompanie/Kurhessisches Pionier-Bataillon Nr. 11
  - 2. Reserve-Kompanie/Kurhessisches Pionier-Bataillon Nr. 11
  - Minenwerfer-Kompanie Nr. 225
- Divisions-Nachrichten-Kommandeur 425
