= Hans von Eulitz =

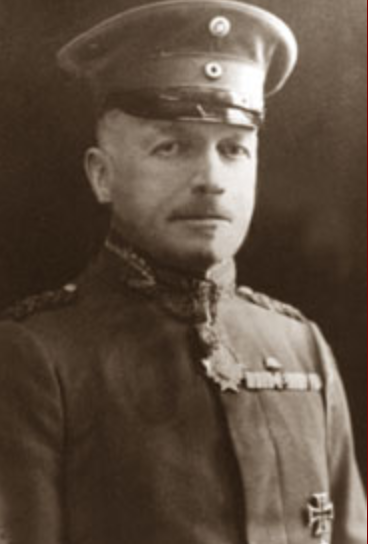
Image of Hans von Eulitz

Hans Alfred von Eulitz (13 September 1866 – 28 November 1945) was a Saxon Army officer who served during World War I.

== Life ==
He was born on 13 September 1866 in the Kingdom of Saxony. He entered the military in 1886 as a Second-Lieutenant. In 1893, he was promoted to Premier Lieutenant, to Hauptmann in 1899, to Major in 1906, and to Oberstleutnant in 1912. In the same year, Eulitz became a staff officer in the XII (1st Royal Saxon) Corps, commanded by Karl Ludwig d'Elsa. In 1914, Eulitz became the corps's chief of staff. He participated in battles on the Western Front. On 14 September 1916, he became commander of the 45th Infantry Brigade. After two months was named chief of staff of Armeeabteilung A. Then, in 1917, he was transferred to the Grand Headquarters. In May of that year Eulitz became an aide-de-camp to King Frederick Augustus III of Saxony; and on 6 November he was promoted to Generalmajor. Near the war's end, during a meeting with Paul von Hindenburg and Erich Ludendorff, he voiced the position that an armistice was necessary. He retired from the army on 4 July 1919.
