= 9th Reserve Division (German Empire) =

9th Reserve Division (9. Reserve-Division)
- Active: 1914-1919
- Country: Prussia/Germany
- Branch: Army
- Type: Infantry
- Size: Approx. 15,000
- Engagements: World War I: Great Retreat, Race to the Sea, Battle of Verdun, Battle of the Somme, Battle of Arras (1917), Passchendaele, Battle of Cambrai (1917), German spring offensive

The 9th Reserve Division (9. Reserve-Division) was a unit of the Imperial German Army, in World War I. The division was formed on the mobilization of the German Army in August 1914. The division was disbanded during the demobilization of the German Army after World War I. The division was a reserve division of the V Reserve Corps and was raised primarily in the Province of Posen and the province of West Prussia.

== Combat chronicle ==
The 9th Reserve Division began the war on the Western Front. It was part of the Fifth Army and pursued the Allies during the Great Retreat to the Woëvre region. It then participated in the Race to the Sea, seeing action in Flanders. It returned to the Woëvre region in December 1914, where it remained until early 1916. In 1916, it fought in the Battle of Verdun until June, and then went to the Champagne region to recover. It then saw action in the later phases of the Battle of the Somme. It remained in the Somme region and fought in the Battle of Arras in early 1917, the Battle of Passchendaele in Autumn 1917, and the tank battle at Cambrai in November 1917. In 1918, it saw action in the German spring offensive, including the Battle of Picardy. It remained in the line in the northern part of the Western Front until war's end. Allied intelligence noted that the division fought well in the battles of 1917, and rated the division as second class in 1918.

== Order of battle on mobilization ==
The order of battle of the 9th Reserve Division on mobilization was as follows:

- 17.Reserve-Infanterie-Brigade
  - Reserve-Infanterie-Regiment Nr. 6
  - Reserve-Infanterie-Regiment Nr. 7
- 19.Reserve-Infanterie-Brigade
  - Reserve-Infanterie-Regiment Nr. 19
  - Reserve-Jäger-Bataillon Nr. 5
- Reserve-Dragoner-Regiment Nr. 3
- Reserve-Feldartillerie-Regiment Nr. 9
- 4.Kompanie/Niederschlesisches Pionier-Bataillon Nr. 5

== Order of battle on March 28, 1918 ==
The 9th Reserve Division was triangularized in March 1915 and reorganized again during the Battle of Verdun in April 1916. Over the course of the war, other changes took place, including the formation of the artillery and signals commands. The order of battle on February 25, 1918, was as follows:

- 18. Reserve-Infanterie-Brigade
  - Reserve-Infanterie-Regiment Nr. 6
  - Reserve-Infanterie-Regiment Nr. 19
  - Infanterie-Regiment Nr. 395
- 3.Eskadron/Reserve-Dragoner-Regiment Nr. 3
- Artillerie-Kommandeur 97
  - Reserve-Feldartillerie-Regiment Nr. 9
  - Fußartillerie-Bataillon Nr. 29
- Stab Pionier-Bataillon Nr. 309
  - 4.Kompanie/Niederschlesisches Pionier-Bataillon Nr. 5
  - 1. Reserve-Kompanie/Samländisches (Festungs-)Pionier-Bataillon Nr. 18
  - Minenwerfer-Kompanie Nr. 209
- Divisions-Nachrichten-Kommandeur 409
