= Ludwig von Lauter =

German general

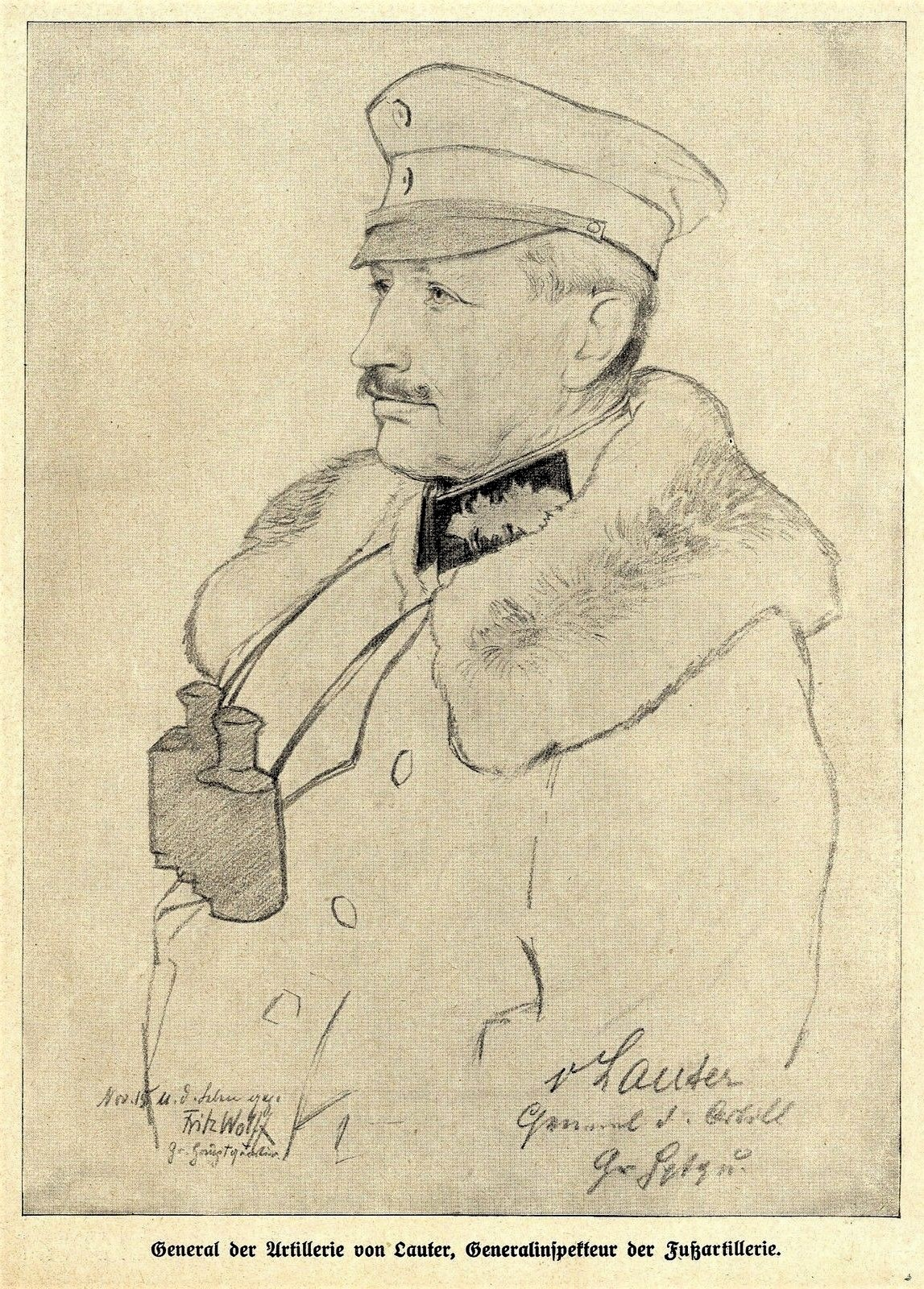
- Born: 23 April 1855; Georgenborn, Grand Duchy of Hesse
- Died: 8 April 1929 (aged 73); Heidelberg, Weimar Republic
- Military career
- Allegiance: German Empire
- Branch: Imperial German Army
- Service years: 1872–1917
- Rank: General der Artillerie
- Commands: Inspector General of Foot Artillery
- Conflicts: World War I

Ludwig Wilhelm Karl von Lauter was a Prussian General der Artillerie who was involved in World War I.

== Life ==
Lauter was born on 23 April 1855 in the Grand Duchy of Hesse. He joined the military in 1872 as a second lieutenant. He was made a premier-lieutenant in 1881, hauptmann in 1886, and major in 1891. By 1904 he was a Generalmajor and in 1911 was promoted to General der Artillerie and appointed as Inspector General of Foot Artillery. In 1913, Lauter was ennobled. During World War I he continued to serve on this post, attached to the Great Headquarters, until 15 October 1917, retiring on the next day. He died at Heidelberg on 8 April 1929.
