= List of largest refugee crises =

This article provides a list of data to rank the largest refugee crises in modern history by the event(s) that caused them. Only those events that resulted in the creation of at least one million refugees—not including internally displaced persons—are included in this ranking.

For events for which estimates vary, the geometric mean of the lowest and highest estimates is calculated in order to rank them. As the dates for some events are disputed, the provided data only covers the time since or between the listed years.

== List ==
Rows that are highlighted in red denote crises that are ongoing, as of 2026. Data for ongoing events may be outdated or disputed, and may be adjusted to reflect smaller or larger figures with newer analyses and reports.

Event	Refugees (est.)	Origin	From	Until	Duration	Ref.
World War II	60 million	Europe	1939	1945	6 years	
Partition of India	20 million	South Asia	1947	1948	1 year	
World War I	15 million	Europe	1914	1918	4 years	
Bangladesh genocide	9.9 million	East Pakistan (Bangladesh) (Note: Pakistan's Operation Searchlight began on 25 March 1971. The Proclamation of Bangladeshi Independence occurred on 26 March 1971 before being taken up by the India-backed Provisional Government of Bangladesh on 10 April 1971.)	1971	1971	8 months	
Venezuelan crisis	8.9 million	Venezuela	2014	Present	11 years	
Russo-Ukrainian war (2022–present)	7 million (Note: Includes 5.7 million Ukrainian refugees globally (not IDPs) and 35,000 Ukrainian children abducted by Russia by the end of 2024; and 900,000+ (total) Russians fleeing the government's military campaign in Ukraine by the aftermath of the 2022 Russian mobilization.)	Europe	2022	Present	4 years, 7 months	
Syrian civil war	6.7 million	Syria	2011	2024	13 years	
Soviet–Afghan War	6.2 million	Afghanistan	1978	1989	11 years	
Yemeni civil war (2014–present)	4.5 million	Yemen	2014	Present	11 years	
Sudanese civil war (2023–present)	4.25 million	Republic of the Sudan	2023	Present	3 years, 5 months	making it the largest displacement crisis in the world.
Indochina crisis	3 million	Mainland Southeast Asia	1975	2000	25 years	
War in Afghanistan (2001–2021)	2.6–2.7 million	Afghanistan	2001	2021	20 years	
Yugoslav Wars	2.4 million	Yugoslavia	1991	2001	10 years	
Korean War	1–5 million	Korean Peninsula	1950	1953	3 years	
Iraq War	2.2 million	Iraq	2003	2011	8 years	
Rwandan genocide	2.1 million	Rwanda	1994	1996	2 years	
Iraqi uprisings	1.8 million	Iraq	1991	1991	1 month	
Wars in the Caucasus	1.5–2 million	Caucasus	1988	1996	8 years	
Mozambican Civil War	1.7 million	Mozambique	1977	1992	15 years	
Arab–Israeli conflict	1.6 million (700,000+ Palestinians and 900,000+ Jews)	West Asia and North Africa	1947	Present	78 years	
South Sudanese Civil War	1.5 million	Republic of South Sudan	2011	2020	9 years	
Rohingya genocide	1.3 million	Myanmar	2016	Present	9 years	
Armenian genocide	1 million	Ottoman Empire	1915	1923	8 years	
Algerian War	1 million	Algeria	1954	1962	8 years	
Irish Great Famine	1 million	Ireland	1845	1849	4 years	
First Libyan Civil War	1 million	Libya	2011	2011	8 months	
Somali Civil War	1 million	Somalia	1991 (Note: Disputed. Various sources also assert 1981 or 1988 (in addition to 1991) as the years in which the conflict began, depending on the event chosen.)	Present	34 years	

== See also ==
- List of sovereign states by refugee population

Armenian refugees in the countries of the Middle East, 1925
Country	Population
Syria	100,000
Lebanon	50,000
Palestine & Jordan	10,000
Egypt	40,000
Iraq	25,000
Iran	50,000
Total	275,000
