= Fort of Merksem =

Military Fort in Merksem, Belgium

Coordinates: 51°15′49″N 4°27′28″E

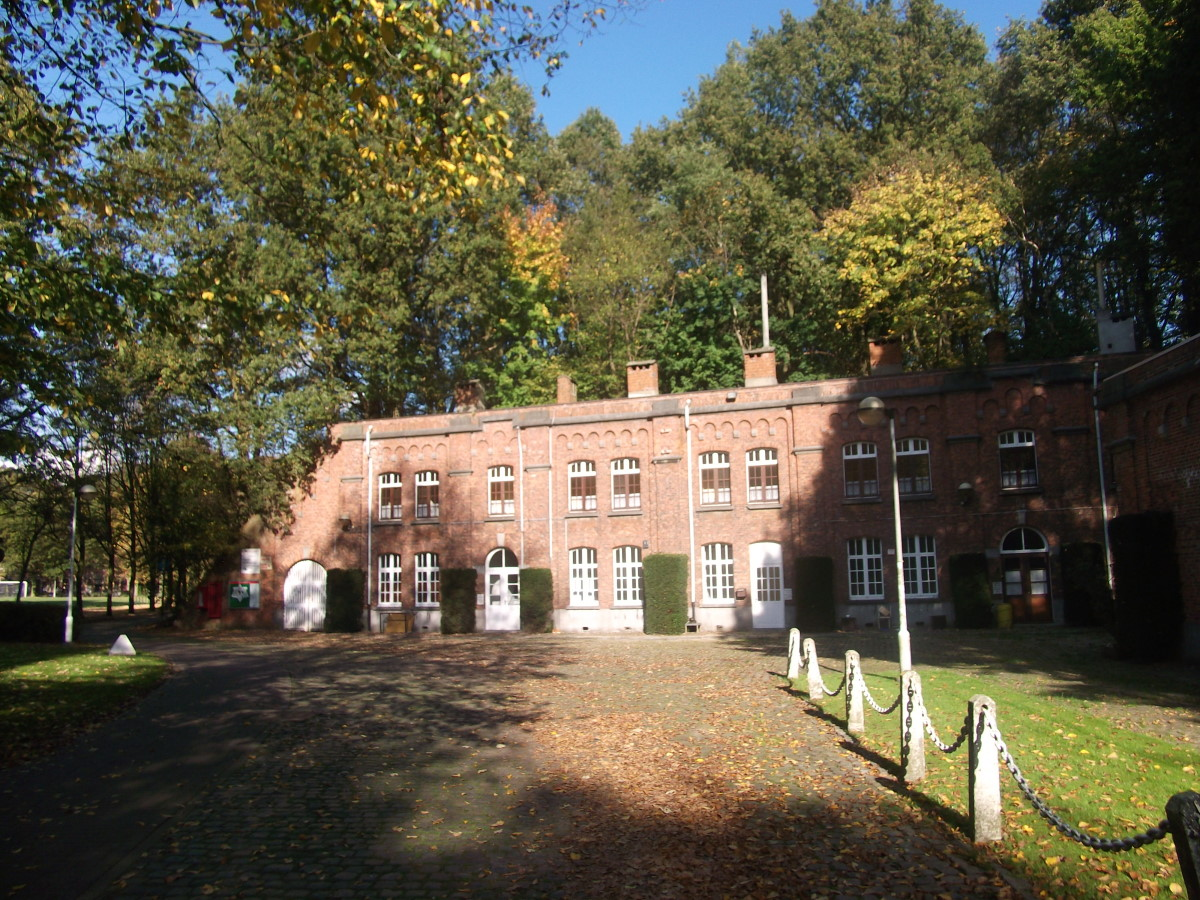
Fort van Merksem

The Fort of Merksem (Dutch: Fort van Merksem, French: Fort de Merksem) was a 32-hectare (0.32 km^{2}) military fortification in Merksem, Belgium. It was built in the year 1876 as part of the defensive ring around the city of Antwerp. In October 1914, during the final stages of the Siege of Antwerp, the fort was slighted by the Belgians in their withdrawal before the advancing German forces. Until 1972 the fort was a military area and in 1977 the fort became public.
