= Victor Deguise =

Belgian Army general

Victor Joseph Dieudonné Deguise
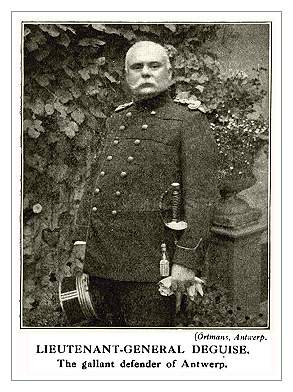
- Born: 22 December 1855; Liège
- Died: 18 March 1925 (aged 69); Ixelles
- Military career
- Allegiance: Belgium
- Service years: 1874-1918
- Rank: Lieutenant-general
- Commands: Military Governor of Antwerp
- Conflicts: World War I; Siege of Antwerp

Lieutenant-General Victor Joseph Dieudonné Deguise (22 December 1855 – 18 March 1925) was a Belgian general responsible for the defence of Antwerp during World War I.

== Career ==
Deguise entered the Belgian Army in 1874 as a lieutenant in the engineering corps. By 1888 he was appointed as professor of fortifications at the Military Academy of the Belgian Army. Between 1909 and 1911 he was the commander of the engineering units in Brussels. Between 1911 and 1914 he was a director of the 3rd military district in Belgium, responsible for fortifications.

=== World War I ===
At the outbreak of World War I he was the military governor of the important port city of Antwerp (at that time the third largest port of the world). After the German attack on Belgium on 4 August 1914, he was ordered by King Albert I of Belgium, the commander-in-chief of the army, that he must hold Antwerp by all means.

The Belgian army retreated to the National redoubt of Belgium on 20 August 1914, from where it conducted two sorties out of Antwerp to force the German army to detach additional troops to the siege and to harass the enemy lines of communication during the First Battle of the Marne. The formal Siege of Antwerp started on 28 September 1914, when following the Siege of Maubeuge heavy siege artillery units had become available. Deguise managed to withstand determined German attacks until the beginning of October, thus enabling the escape of significant Belgian and British military personnel towards Nieuwpoort. However the arrival of heavy German siege guns (such as the Big Bertha) made his position untenable, and he was forced to surrender the city on 10 October 1914.

He was taken to a prisoner-of-war camp for officers in Germany. First to Heidelberg and then to Gütersloh, where he would remain until the end of the war.
