= List of sovereign states by refugee population =

This article provides a list of data to show the total number of refugees that are hosted in each sovereign state in the world. The United Nations defines a refugee as any person who is "forced to flee their own country and seek safety in another country. They are unable to return to their own country because of feared persecution as a result of who they are, what they believe in or say, or because of armed conflict, violence or serious public disorder."

Accommodations for refugees vary by country and situation. Some may be kept in refugee camps, some are urban refugees in individual residences, some stay in self-settled camps, and the location of some refugees is undefined or unknown by the United Nations High Commissioner for Refugees (UNHCR).

== By destination country of asylum ==
The below table is based on UNHCR data and does not include data for people of concern to the UNRWA or those not known to the UNHCR. These people have fled their country/territory of origin and registered with the UNHCR in these countries or territories.

UNHCR registered refugees by country/territory of asylum between 2012 and 2022 (Note: Countries/territories with less than 10 refugees in the given time period (2012 to 2022) are not included in this table. These (20) countries/territories are: Aruba, Barbados, British Virgin Islands, Grenada, Haiti, Macau, Micronesia, Palau, Saint Kitts and Nevis, Saint Lucia, Samoa, Sint Maarten, Seychelles, Singapore, Solomon Islands, East Timor, Tonga, Turks and Caicos Islands, Vanuatu, and Vietnam.)
Country/territory of asylum	2024	Refugees per 1,000 inhabitants in mid-2015	2022	2019	mid-2016	mid-2015	2014	2013	2012
Afghanistan	20,866	7.14	52,159	72,228	59,771	205,558	280,267	72	75
Albania	9,381	0.05	2,676	128	138	154	104	96	86
Algeria	183,368	2.42	99,107	98,604	94,232	94,144	94,128	94,150	94,133
Angola	25,275	0.64	25,514	25,802	15,555	15,572	15,474	23,783	23,413
Argentina	4,409	0.08	4,094	3,881	3,293	3,523	3,498	3,362	3,488
Armenia	144,379	5.22	34,634	17,985	17,886	3,240	3,190	3,132	2,854
Australia	29,511	1.51	54,430	76,764	42,188	35,582	35,582	34,503	30,083
Austria	284,828	7.13	258,613	135,955	93,250	60,747	60,747	55,598	51,730
Azerbaijan	6,431	0.14	6,414	1,108	1,193	1,357	1,299	1,380	1,468
Bahamas	10	0.02	10	12	13	7	13	15	30
Bahrain	250	0.20	255	255	271	277	311	294	289
Bangladesh	1,005,602	1.46	952,384	854,782	950,000	32,975	32,472	31,145	30,697
Belarus	43,397	0.14	19,715	2,734	1,650	1,369	925	604	576
Belgium	183,551	2.77	151,408	61,677	42,168	31,115	29,179	25,629	22,024
Belize	286		145	28			10	21	28
Benin	16,232	0.05	1,779	1,244	809	488	415	194	4,966
Bolivia	1,117	0.07	1,116	878	786	767	763	748	733
Bosnia and Herzegovina	495	1.78	274	5,248	5,271	6,805	6,890	6,926	6,903
Botswana	816	0.97	733	1,115	2,039	2,164	2,645	2,773	2,785
Brazil	257,079	0.04	67,522	32,860	9,689	7,762	7,490	5,196	4,689
Bulgaria	108,747	1.53	176,297	20,451	17,814	11,046	11,046	4,320	2,288
Burkina Faso	39,915	1.92	34,375	25,868	32,552	34,027	31,894	29,234	39,306
Burundi	89,075	5.00	84,636	78,473	57,469	54,126	52,936	45,490	41,813
Cambodia	23	0.01	24	61	66	80	63	68	77
Cameroon	427,706	13.27	473,887	406,260	348,672	288,552	226,489	107,346	98,969
Canada	269,496	4.19	140,621	101,760	97,332	149,163	149,163	160,349	163,756
Central African Republic	45,108	1.65	11,213	7,175	12,115	7,906	7,694	14,322	14,014
Cayman Islands	50	0.10	47		18	6	6	6	3
Chad	1,278,866	30.97	592,764	442,672	391,251	420,774	452,897	434,479	373,695
Chile	2,443	0.10	2,133	2,053	1,737	1,798	1,773	1,743	1,695
China	261	0.22	320,000	303,381	317,255	301,057	301,052	301,047	301,037
Colombia	1,306		1,607	646	258	219	213	224	219
Democratic Republic of Congo	517,404	2.14	520,544	523,734	451,956	160,271	119,754	113,362	65,109
Republic of Congo	62,052	13.65	41,557	25,670	46,457	61,492	54,842	51,037	98,455
Costa Rica	31,632	0.73	14,088	6,217	4,180	3,475	12,924	12,749	12,629
Ivory Coast	2,377	0.09	5,636	2,021	1,399	1,972	1,925	2,980	3,980
Croatia	28,707	0.17	20,638	916	304	669	679	656	690
Cuba	130	0.03	174	237	316	313	280	384	371
Curaçao	0	0.28		47	54	44	37	15	14
Cyprus	45,750	4.99	29,280	12,325	8,484	5,763	5,126	3,883	3,631
Czech Republic	391,133	0.30	435,212	2,058	3,644	3,137	3,137	2,979	2,805
Denmark	98,204	3.15	67,772	37,540	33,507	17,785	17,785	13,170	11,814
Djibouti	23,987	16.88	20,383	19,641	17,683	14,787	20,530	20,015	19,139
Dominican Republic	18	0.06	546	171	592	609	608	721	758
Ecuador	23,218	7.65	60,125	104,574	60,524	53,378	53,817	54,865	55,480
Egypt	238,014	2.53	294,632	258,401	213,530	226,344	236,090	230,086	109,933
El Salvador	120	0.01	104	52	45	48	35	44	45
Eritrea	119	0.58	119	199	2,342	2,944	2,898	3,166	3,600
Estonia	42,267	0.09	40,806	334	322	117	90	70	63
Ethiopia	1,008,826	7.24	879,598	733,125	791,631	702,467	659,524	433,936	376,393
Fiji	15	0.01	5	13	12	12	13	5	6
Finland	93,182	2.15	69,553	23,473	18,400	11,798	11,798	11,252	9,919
France	721,771	4.13	612,934	407,923	304,546	264,972	252,264	232,487	217,865
Gabon	179	0.60	205	459	931	1,008	1,013	1,594	1,663
Gambia	3,964	6.11	3,685	4,308	7,940	11,773	11,608	9,563	9,853
Georgia	31,027	0.41	27,839	1,360	1,531	1,060	442	356	329
Germany	2,749,266	3.10	2,075,445	1,146,685	669,482	250,299	216,973	187,567	589,737
Ghana	7,479	0.69	8,531	11,948	11,865	18,476	18,450	18,681	16,016
Greece	116,450	0.75	160,761	80,468	21,484	7,304	7,304	3,485	2,100
Guatemala	1,306	0.01	701	416	300	202	164	160	159
Guinea	2,171	0.71	2,199	4,965	5,068	8,704	8,766	8,560	10,371
Guinea-Bissau	24	4.82	24	1,852	9,263	8,684	8,684	8,535	7,784
Guyana	27	0.01	12	17	11	11	11	11	7
Honduras	202		164	76	16	23	26	16	16
Hong Kong	260	0.02	285	130		151	170	126	117
Hungary	72,359	0.42	35,370	5,772	4,748	4,192	2,867	2,440	4,054
Iceland	7,879	0.32	5,240	916	252	104	99	79	60
India	236,763	0.15	242,835	195,105	197,851	200,383	199,937	188,395	185,656
Indonesia	7,799	0.02	9,785	10,295	7,827	5,277	4,270	3,206	1,819
Iran	3,489,257	12.53	3,425,091	979,435	979,435	979,441	982,027	857,354	868,242
Iraq	318,461	8.17	273,716	273,992	261,864	288,035	271,143	246,298	98,822
Ireland	312,849	1.25	81,256	7,800	5,731	5,853	5,853	6,001	6,327
Israel	1,266	0.04	1,207	16,121	507	361	330	184	104
Italy	312,849	1.57	296,181	207,619	147,370	93,715	93,715	76,264	64,779
Jamaica		0.01	31	1	14	15	22	21	20
Japan	29,068	0.02	17,406	1,465	2,514	2,419	2,560	2,584	2,581
Jordan	643,641	89.55	3,062,851	2,967,046	685,197	664,102	654,141	641,915	302,707
Kazakhstan	65,833	0.04	308	524	653	662	633	584	564
Kenya	604,257	12.31	504,473	438,901	451,099	552,272	551,352	534,938	564,933
South Korea	4,241	0.03	3,825	3,215	1,807	1,313	1,173	548	487
Kuwait	488	0.16	684	692	939	593	614	635	674
Kyrgyzstan	23,678	0.07	274	353	339	433	482	466	437
Latvia	49,220	0.10	39,055	672	349	195	183	160	125
Lebanon	758,642	208.91	1,306,143	1,395,952	1,012,969	1,172,388	1,154,040	856,546	133,538
Lesotho	419	0.02	251	147	45	44	44	30	34
Liberia	1,167	8.85	620	8,238	18,990	38,904	38,587	53,245	65,901
Libya	200,335	4.47	2,208	4,739	9,310	27,948	27,964	25,561	7,065
Liechtenstein	841	2.89	524	132	163	107	103	97	102
Lithuania	53,561	0.36	67,638	1,826	1,288	1,055	1,007	916	871
Luxembourg	10,059	2.14	11,952	2,572	2,046	1,192	1,108	920	2,910
Madagascar	83		119	116	28	10	11	12	9
Malawi	35,510	0.54	35,162	14,086	9,392	8,963	5,874	5,796	6,544
Malaysia	138,417	3.26	134,554	129,095	92,054	97,385	99,086	96,868	89,210
Mali	135,533	0.88	60,637	26,670	17,512	14,970	15,195	14,316	13,928
Malta	7,814	14.58	11,098	8,911	7,948	6,095	6,095	9,906	8,248
Mauritania	155,193	19.36	100,981	84,909	48,148	50,851	49,635	66,767	54,496
Mexico	150,836	0.02	95,579	28,533	6,202	2,158	1,837	1,831	1,520
Moldova	135,941	0.10	105,374	423		389	335	250	185
Monaco	17	0.87	17	22	27	33	33	34	37
Mongolia	11		10	6	8	11	6	9	4
Montenegro	18,670	9.92	32,438	662	974	6,203	6,462	8,476	11,198
Morocco	7,470	0.06	7,907	6,656	4,771	2,144	1,216	1,470	744
Mozambique	5,370	0.17	4,992	4,708	4,671	4,552	4,536	4,445	4,398
Namibia	5,258	0.69	4,685	3,188	1,757	1,659	1,767	2,332	1,806
Nauru	5	50.60	45	763	506	506	389		
Nepal	19,598	1.29	19,560	19,574	25,249	36,287	38,490	46,305	56,264
Netherlands	263,399	4.89	218,457	94,430	101,744	82,494	82,494	74,707	71,909
New Zealand	2,063	0.30	1,791	2,747	1,421	1,349	1,349	1,403	1,517
Nicaragua		0.06	312	327	331	361	280	189	129
Niger	369,836	4.29	255,307	180,006	166,093	82,064	77,830	57,661	50,510
Nigeria	96,387	0.01	91,275	54,166	1,367	1,279	1,239	1,694	3,154
North Macedonia	20,911	0.40	635	353	477	584	614	687	750
Norway	123,981	9.14	75,311	53,888	59,522	47,043	47,043	46,106	42,822
Oman	294	0.03	295	307	317	122	151	138	138
Pakistan	1,560,480	8.33	1,743,785	1,419,606	1,352,560	1,540,854	1,505,525	1,616,507	1,638,456
Panama	2,658	4.47	2,576	2,557	2,350	2,303	2,271	2,665	2,429
Papua New Guinea	7,732	1.27	10,524	9,707	4,955	4,929	4,929	4,797	4,802
Paraguay	6,071	0.02	5,420	1,016	204	161	153	136	133
Peru	6,742	0.05	6,543	2,879	1,649	1,407	1,303	1,162	1,122
Philippines	962		856	690	408	254	222	182	141
Poland	1,008,871	0.41	971,129	12,673	11,747	15,741	15,741	16,438	15,911
Portugal	68,603	0.07	59,777	2,387	1,194	699	699	598	483
Qatar	197	0.06	197	203	177	133	133	130	80
Romania	184,529	0.12	105,621	3,882	2,905	2,426	2,182	1,770	1,262
Russia	10,077	2.20	1,277,753	42,433	228,990	315,313	235,750	3,458	3,178
Rwanda	114,368	11.70	120,753	145,057	156,065	132,743	73,820	73,349	58,212
Saudi Arabia	448	0.01	454	320	133	184	534	532	550
Senegal	11,836	0.97	11,802	14,469	14,584	14,304	14,274	14,247	14,237
Serbia and Kosovo	36,068	3.97	26,521	26,433	29,522	35,309	43,751	57,083	66,370
Sierra Leone	0	0.22		443	683	1,371	1,372	2,817	4,204
Slovakia	144,269	0.15	96,563	977	990	799	799	701	662
Slovenia	12,524	0.14	8,705	751	462	283	257	213	176
Somalia	19,503	0.34	16,023	17,883	11,574	3,582	2,729	2,425	2,264
South Africa	71,171	2.12	66,596	89,285	91,043	114,512	112,192	65,987	65,233
Spain	429,333	0.13	317,751	57,761	12,989	5,798	5,798	4,637	4,510
Sri Lanka	232	0.04	504	1,045	604	848	511	145	110
Sudan	793,395	9.05	1,097,128	1,055,489	421,466	322,638	244,430	124,328	126,218
South Sudan	514,794	22.32	308,369	298,313	262,560	265,887	248,152	229,587	202,581
Suriname	24		25	52	1	1			
Swaziland		0.42	1173		728	539	515	507	505
Sweden	163,029	14.66	277,726	253,794	230,164	142,207	142,207	114,175	92,872
Switzerland	196,167	8.45	182,474	110,168	82,681	69,390	62,620	52,464	50,747
Syria	11,635	7.95	593,844	583,443	19,809	149,200	149,140	149,292	476,506
Tajikistan	12,157	0.21	8,608	3,791	2,729	1,782	2,026	2,048	2,248
Tanzania	176,859	3.07	206,229	242,171	281,498	159,014	88,492	102,099	101,021
Thailand	84,421	1.63	94,472	97,571	54,251	56,947	75,137	78,970	84,479
Togo	47,494	3.07	9,300	11,968	12,491	21,877	21,778	20,613	23,540
Trinidad and Tobago	3,328	0.09	3,424	2,321	109	121	83	20	18
Tunisia	2,955	0.07	3,299	1,746	649	824	901	730	1,435
Turkey	2,940,735	23.72	3,568,259	3,579,531	2,869,421	1,838,848	1,587,374	609,938	267,063
Turkmenistan	3,409	0.01	14	22	27	27	35	45	46
Uganda	1,759,492	11.34	1,463,523	1,359,464	940,835	428,397	385,513	220,555	197,877
Ukraine	2,389	0.07	2,520	2,172	3,302	3,232	3,219	2,968	2,807
United Arab Emirates	1,377	0.05	1,399	1,247	895	424	417	603	631
United Kingdom	515,677	1.82	328,989	133,094	118,995	117,234	117,234	126,055	149,799
United States	435,333	0.84	363,059	341,711	272,959	267,222	267,222	263,662	262,023
Uruguay	1,322	0.08	1,115	516	312	289	272	203	181
Uzbekistan	8,505		13,026	14	27	118	125	141	176
Venezuela	19,333	5.68	29,341	67,755	7,861	5,647	5,052	4,340	3,644
Yemen	46,827	10.05	77,458	268,511	269,783	263,047	257,645	241,288	237,182
Zambia	79,275	1.64	61,159	57,521	29,350	25,737	25,578	23,594	25,653
Zimbabwe	9,240	0.40	10,475	8,959	7,426	6,085	6,079	6,389	4,356

== By country of origin ==
The below table is based on UNHCR data and does not include data for people of concern to the UNRWA or those not known to the UNHCR. These people registered with the UNHCR outside of their country of origin.

UNHCR registered refugees by country/territory of origin between 2014 and 2010 (Note: Countries/territories with less than 10 refugees in the given time period (2010 to 2014) are not included in this table. These (17) countries/territories are: Andorra, Brunei, Cayman Islands, Cook Islands, Finland, Gibraltar, Iceland, Luxembourg, Malta, Marshall Islands, Monaco, Norfolk Island, Palau, Samoa, San Marino, Tuvalu, and Vanuatu.)
Country/territory of origin	2024	% of the country's population who were refugees in 2014	2014	2013	2012	2011	2010
Afghanistan	5,766,586	7.59	2,596,270	2,556,502	2,586,152	2,664,436	3,054,709
Albania	21,875	0.35	10,158	10,103	12,568	13,551	14,772
Algeria	8,800	0.01	3,524	3,660	5,673	6,120	6,688
Angola	12,545	0.04	9,484	10,286	19,258	128,664	134,858
Antigua and Barbuda	91	0.06	53	49	45	32	30
Argentina	464	0.00	318	388	447	518	557
Armenia	15,933	0.39	11,848	11,998	15,934	16,486	17,546
Australia	31	0.00	25	28	48	39	37
Austria	33	0.00	10	10	12	11	10
Azerbaijan	153,154	0.11	10,515	10,814	15,537	16,162	16,753
Bahamas	1,449	0.06	215	210	196	185	17
Bahrain	289	0.03	347	275	297	215	87
Bangladesh	28,473	0.01	10,881	9,725	10,156	10,052	10,046
Barbados	415	0.03	86	67	55	45	32
Belarus	17,704	0.05	4,300	4,397	6,191	5,925	5,743
Belgium	93	0.00	75	78	93	90	83
Belize	104	0.01	45	40	39	32	23
Benin	1,064	0.00	340	302	457	461	442
Bhutan	7,433	3.00	23,642	31,567	41,590	55,603	72,776
Bolivia	612	0.01	600	601	618	611	590
Bosnia and Herzegovina	26,821	0.57	21,841	26,756	51,767	58,515	62,910
Botswana	249	0.01	237	168	127	85	53
Brazil	5,072	0.00	977	985	1,076	1,045	994
Bulgaria	498	0.02	1,648	1,880	2,147	2,327	2,559
Burkina Faso	150,081	0.01	1,853	1,580	1,456	1,267	1,141
Burundi	322,462	0.67	72,493	72,647	73,363	101,288	84,064
Cambodia	11,474	0.09	13,062	13,713	13,993	15,184	16,301
Cameroon	109,879	0.05	10,766	11,427	13,382	15,163	14,963
Canada	309	0.00	95	99	119	105	90
Cape Verde	14	0.01	27	28	25	27	25
Central African Republic	693,488	7.88	410,787	249,044	162,442	160,736	162,755
Chad	14,617	0.11	14,855	15,237	15,844	18,720	21,583
Chile	4,809	0.00	579	596	1,152	1,189	1,170
China	153,564	0.02	210,802	195,133	193,453	190,369	184,602
Colombia	77,775	0.22	103,150	108,117	111,773	113,605	113,233
Comoros	2,322	0.08	581	513	454	422	368
Democratic Republic of Congo	1,060,086	0.69	516,563	499,355	509,082	491,481	476,693
Republic of the Congo	14,110	0.32	14,500	11,753	12,119	12,839	20,679
Costa Rica	316	0.01	417	463	325	331	352
Ivory Coast	29,442	0.32	71,966	85,652	100,717	154,824	41,758
Croatia	17,891	0.93	40,122	49,756	62,606	62,649	65,861
Cuba	23,865	0.06	6,502	6,460	6,724	6,849	6,470
Curaçao	8	0.02	35	35			
Cyprus	10	0.00	10	10	11	11	13
Czech Republic	1,057	0.01	1,327	991	622	763	817
Denmark	16	0.00	12	10	9	9	9
Djibouti	2,055	0.10	879	762	640	602	566
Dominica	88	0.05	38	43	54	52	52
Dominican Republic	1,080	0.00	349	306	289	250	246
Ecuador	5,015	0.01	804	707	844	909	852
Egypt	23,736	0.02	15,903	12,810	10,016	7,934	6,911
El Salvador	71,765	0.18	10,965	9,635	8,171	6,720	4,976
Equatorial Guinea	426	0.02	174	200	228	258	305
Eritrea	551,296	6.08	330,541	273,063	248,024	220,745	205,458
Estonia	126	0.03	339	352	456	224	240
Ethiopia	164,423	0.09	86,870	77,122	74,939	70,586	68,832
Fiji	248	0.10	924	1,112	1,317	1,579	1,851
France	139	0.00	93	98	100	99	92
Gabon	948	0.01	172	176	183	173	165
Gambia	8,140	0.27	5,136	3,397	3,076	2,583	2,242
Georgia	16,554	0.17	6,681	6,778	9,261	9,612	10,143
Germany	348	0.00	176	175	182	174	164
Ghana	15,078	0.08	22,143	21,076	24,296	20,279	20,201
Greece	97	0.00	113	91	51	56	51
Grenada	100	0.30	324	330	316	323	345
Guatemala	36,323	0.05	7,483	6,615	6,388	6,088	5,679
Guinea	42,096	0.12	15,252	14,561	14,061	13,161	11,985
Guinea-Bissau	1,900	0.07	1,307	1,223	1,180	1,123	1,127
Guyana	313	0.09	700	800	801	771	749
Haiti	148,252	0.35	37,162	38,659	38,568	33,661	25,892
Honduras	100,969	0.05	4,159	3,300	2,613	1,966	1,302
Hong Kong	240	0.00	25	25	19	15	17
Hungary	1,984	0.01	1,267	1,220	1,087	1,238	1,438
India	39,303	0.00	10,436	11,041	14,258	16,232	17,769
Indonesia	9,172	0.00	9,562	9,640	10,051	10,659	11,085
Iran	158,171	0.11	82,191	75,070	75,938	72,347	68,795
Iraq	305,504	1.04	369,954	401,466	746,190	1,428,308	1,683,575
Ireland	68	0.00	10	9	9	8	8
Israel	1,307	0.01	979	1,041	1,340	1,335	1,301
Italy	263	0.00	67	66	66	58	50
Jamaica	2,552	0.06	1,692	1,503	1,407	1,252	1,057
Japan	55	0.00	262	157	172	176	152
Jordan	4,990	0.02	1,718	1,632	2,358	2,248	2,252
Kazakhstan	4,119	0.01	2,224	2,123	3,571	3,500	3,640
Kenya	11,696	0.02	8,553	8,586	8,950	8,745	8,602
Kiribati	5	0.00	3	20	33	33	33
North Korea	283	0.01	1,282	1,167	1,132	1,052	917
South Korea	142	0.00	481	500	558	514	585
Kuwait	3,019	0.03	981	977	1,197	1,120	988
Kyrgyzstan	3,400	0.04	2,451	2,301	3,489	3,162	2,744
Laos	6,556	0.11	7,482	7,744	7,983	8,087	8,413
Latvia	179	0.01	213	233	662	709	713
Lebanon	9,534	0.08	4,273	3,819	15,106	15,013	15,869
Lesotho	25	0.00	17	15	13	11	11
Liberia	5,086	0.31	13,545	17,531	23,401	66,752	70,089
Libya	17,235	0.07	4,203	3,314	5,249	3,335	2,309
Lithuania	111	0.01	183	220	491	528	515
Macau	15	0.00	5	1	1	10	10
Madagascar	604	0.00	281	296	300	288	269
Malawi	570	0.00	361	326	277	222	171
Malaysia	1,209	0.00	468	485	531	537	552
Maldives	76	0.01	36	31	24	21	19
Mali	354,075	0.81	139,267	152,828	149,942	4,295	3,663
Mauritania	38,111	0.85	34,113	34,252	33,765	39,929	37,733
Mauritius	263	0.01	94	81	62	42	28
Mexico	39,241	0.01	10,666	9,390	8,435	7,472	6,816
Moldova	6,236	0.05	2,233	2,207	6,148	6,264	6,200
Mongolia	2,501	0.07	2,163	2,059	2,114	1,985	1,724
Montenegro	763	0.10	607	546	4,054	3,698	3,246
Morocco	10,609	0.00	1,539	1,308	2,405	2,312	2,284
Mozambique	114	0.00	58	56	160	155	131
Myanmar	1,322,503	0.42	223,896	222,053	215,340	214,594	215,644
Namibia	646	0.05	1,253	1,143	1,098	1,073	1,017
Nepal	7,840	0.03	8,561	8,108	7,610	6,852	5,884
Netherlands	136	0.00	68	64	71	64	53
New Zealand	52	0.00	17	17	20	18	15
Nicaragua	30,020	0.03	1,587	1,538	1,531	1,468	1,431
Niger	44,119	0.00	739	683	832	819	803
Nigeria	467,605	0.03	54,563	25,465	18,020	16,840	15,639
Niue	5	1.11	18	14	10	7	
North Macedonia	2,013	0.08	1,759	1,628	7,589	7,684	7,890
Norway	22	0.00	13	13	9	7	7
Oman	118	0.00	29	26	65	60	63
Pakistan	86,285	0.17	315,805	31,893	33,673	33,009	33,591
(Palestine) Palestinians (excl. UNRWA)		2.10	97,212	96,044	94,821	94,121	93,299
Panama	333	0.00	89	105	107	100	100
Papua New Guinea	504	0.00	288	221	174	128	89
Paraguay	170	0.00	94	95	101	91	86
Peru	6,459	0.01	4,343	4,768	5,212	5,491	5,834
Philippines	785	0.00	666	717	966	933	953
Poland	1,528	0.00	1,310	1,429	1,640	1,815	1,764
Portugal	110	0.00	31	32	32	28	30
Qatar	65	0.00	21	17	124	95	112
Romania	2,919	0.01	1,918	2,330	2,806	3,428	3,933
Russia	96,869	0.05	70,562	74,316	110,586	109,784	108,261
Rwanda	249,096	0.70	79,408	83,955	97,373	106,833	114,836
Saint Kitts and Nevis	27	0.04	23	15	12	9	7
Saint Lucia	160	0.50	922	710	566	433	334
Saint Vincent and the Grenadines	186	1.56	1,736	1,535	1,316	1,127	946
Sao Tome and Principe	5	0.01	22	31	32	33	33
Saudi Arabia	2,332	0.00	630	584	817	745	667
Senegal	12,947	0.16	23,118	19,822	18,724	17,722	16,267
Serbia and Kosovo	31,438	0.51	45,464	48,436	157,623	161,363	182,955
Seychelles	10	0.03	25	26	29	42	49
Sierra Leone	8,042	0.08	4,993	5,311	6,202	8,002	11,277
Singapore	45	0.00	59	65	68	67	76
Slovakia	664	0.01	319	323	239	269	158
Slovenia	17	0.00	26	28	34	32	38
Solomon Islands	44	0.01	70	61	61	72	75
Somalia	894,120	9.52	1,106,434	1,121,770	1,136,718	1,075,148	770,148
South Africa	1,174	0.00	424	423	420	429	380
Spain	174	0.00	60	56	52	43	42
Sri Lanka	147,033	0.59	122,010	123,083	132,721	136,605	141,063
Sudan	2,094,373	1.65	659,408	636,405	558,199	491,013	379,067
South Sudan	2,290,622	4.92	616,143	114,371	86,909	1	
Suriname	50	0.00	17	17	15	20	25
Swaziland		0.01	161	109	65	43	36
Sweden	98	0.00	18	16	19	23	24
Switzerland	5	0.00	19	15	17	20	19
Syria	5,952,174	17.09	3,869,626	2,457,241	728,698	19,900	18,428
Tajikistan	4,045	0.01	725	662	674	612	577
Tanzania	1,259	0.00	858	1,040	1,122	1,163	1,144
Thailand	300	0.00	231	217	369	359	348
Tibet	12,576	0.47	15,069	15,065	15,000	15,068	15,082
East Timor	5	0.00	13	10	9	8	8
Togo	12,685	0.13	9,275	10,318	15,692	17,870	18,329
Tonga	42	0.02	22	18	13	10	6
Trinidad and Tobago	474	0.03	371	336	333	297	255
Tunisia	3,593	0.01	1,485	1,363	1,934	1,951	2,173
Turkey	139,640	0.08	63,892	66,575	135,370	139,778	146,793
Turkmenistan	2,580	0.01	484	519	723	726	738
Turks and Caicos Islands	14	0.04	15	15	14	14	1
Uganda	10,384	0.02	7,190	8,176	5,608	5,680	6,441
Ukraine	5,120,036	0.53	237,625	5,163	25,254	25,379	25,111
United Arab Emirates	261	0.00	90	90	584	486	424
United Kingdom	417	0.00	141	142	153	150	152
United States	4,004	0.00	4,987	4,760	4,453	3,777	3,025
Uruguay	131	0.00	124	147	171	184	186
Uzbekistan	5,152	0.02	4,795	4,952	7,088	7,164	6,886
Venezuela	370,169	0.03	8,009	8,395	8,208	7,577	6,701
Vietnam	19,961	0.34	313,417	314,106	336,939	337,829	338,698
Western Sahara	174,578	13.89	90,482	90,504	90,452	90,413	90,415
Yemen	51,384	0.01	2,631	2,428	2,593	2,322	2,075
Zambia	337	0.00	316	232	243	240	228
Zimbabwe	8,002	0.15	22,492	19,734	22,101	25,048	24,089
Stateless	36,296	0.28	27,915	20,202	19,673	18,171	16,909
Various/unknown			99,577	105,643	125,921	137,412	160,678

== People in refugee-like situations by continental region ==
The table is sourced from the UNHCR Global Trends Report 2022.

Continent	Refugees
North America	443,500
Oceania	79,600
Europe	3,435,700
South America	4,701,600
Asia-Pacific	10,084,900
Africa	6,988,900
Antarctica	0 (N/A)

== See also ==
- List of largest refugee crises
