= Belgian Military Field of Honour 1914–1918 =

Burial site in Harderwijk, Netherlands

- Belgisch Militair Ereveld 1914–1918
- Oorlogsgravenstichting
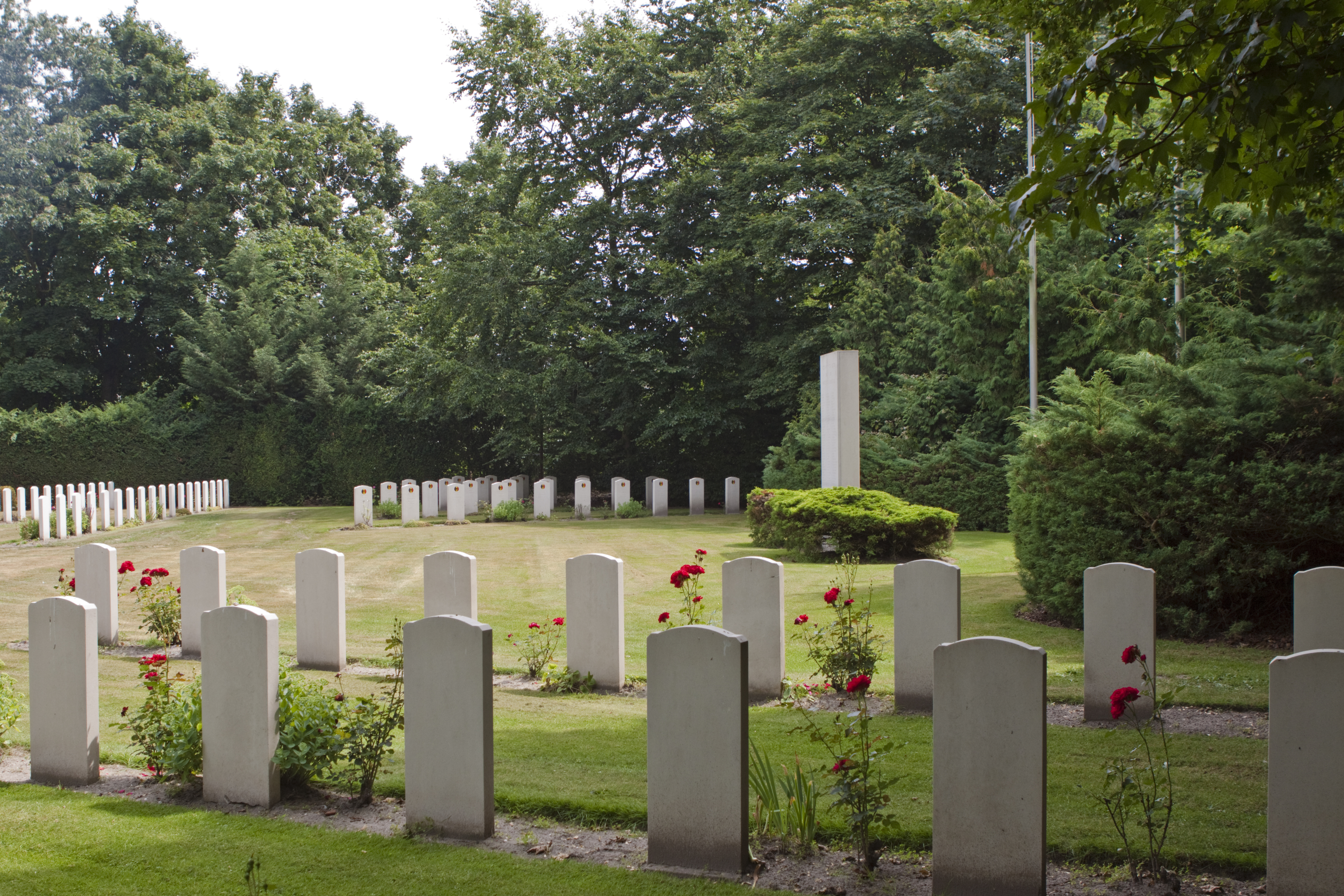
- Overview of the burial site.
- For Belgian military refugees who died in the Netherlands during the First World War.
- Established: September 28, 1963
- Location: 52°20′50.6″N 5°38′25.2″E; Oostergaarde Cemetery, Harderwijk, the Netherlands
- Commemorated: 349
- GESTORVEN VOOR BELGIE 1914 1918 MORTS POUR LA BELGIQUE

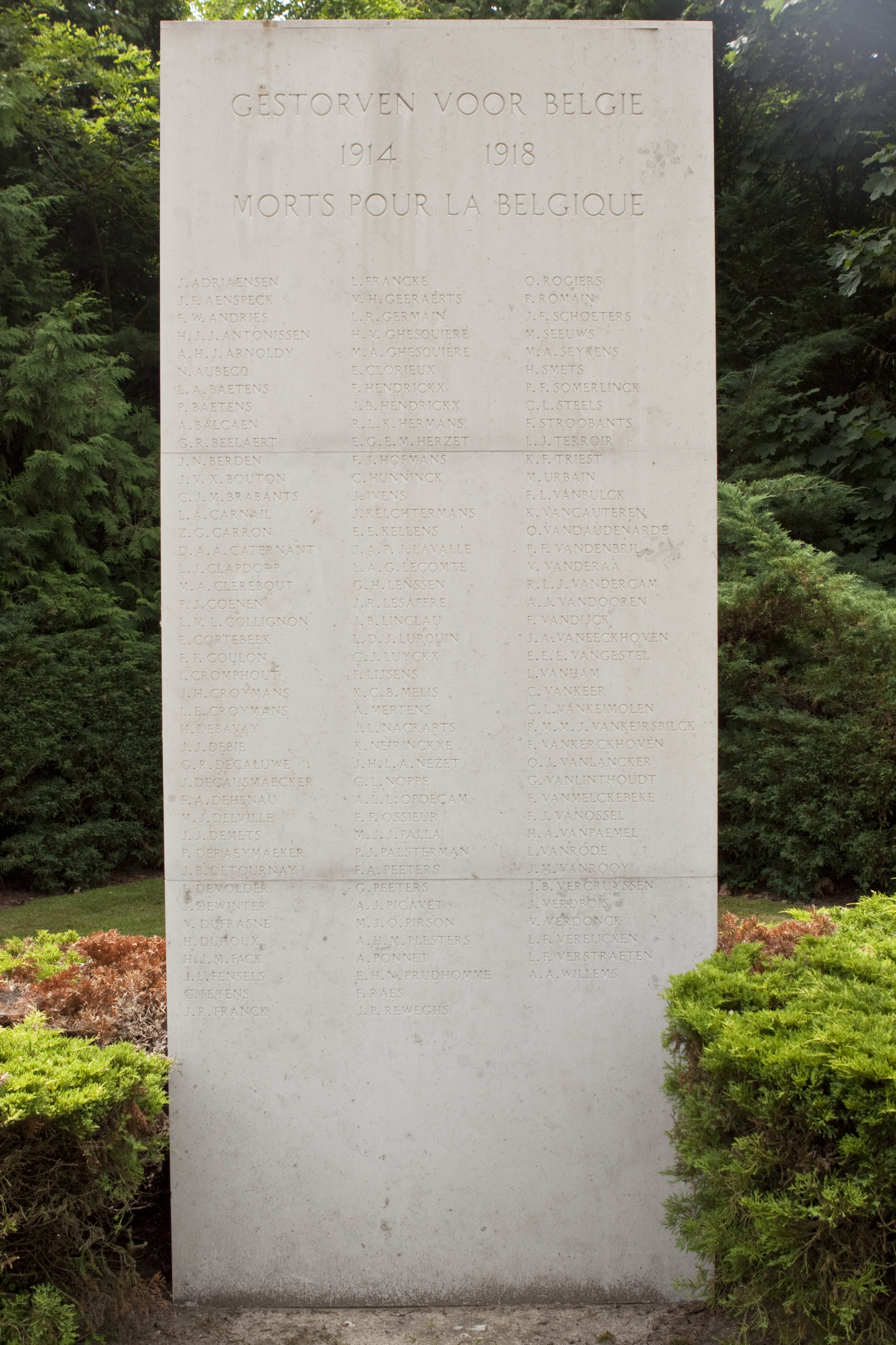
Monument honouring 124 Belgian soldiers

The Belgian Military Field of Honour 1914–1918 (Dutch: Belgisch Militair Ereveld 1914–1918; French: Cimetière d'honneur militaire belge 1914–1918), is a burial site located at the Oostergaarde Cemetery of the Dutch city Harderwijk in Gelderland. Originally, thirty-six soldiers were buried at the site. Nowadays, 349 Belgian soldiers from the First World War are commemorated. These include 124 individuals whose names feature on a monument because their remains could not be retrieved anymore. The cemetery was inaugurated on 28 September 1963 by the Belgian ambassador. The gravestones are similar to the ones used by the Commonwealth War Graves Commission and are varying from the official Belgian gravestones. The burial site is administered by the Dutch Oorlogsgravenstichting ("war graves foundation").

During the First World War, around 33,000 Belgian soldiers fled to the neutral Netherlands after the Belgian city of Antwerp fell to the German troops in 1914. In compliance with the 1907 Hague Convention, the military refugees were disarmed and interned by the Dutch. Through the influx of refugees, Harderwijk, where a refugee camp was located, tripled its population. Most of the victims buried at the Belgian Military Field of Honour died of tuberculosis, or the 1918–1919 outbreak of the Spanish flu. Therefore, many of the 349 soldiers died in 1918 or 1919. Other buried refugees include six victims of the uprising at camp Zeist in Soesterberg on 3 December 1914, when the interned refugees revolted against the bad living conditions in the camp, provoking the Dutch guards to violently suppress the uprising.

A six-year-old girl named Woutje van de Velde is buried not far from the field of honour. She was sexually assaulted and murdered by an interned Belgian corporal in 1917. As a gesture, the Belgian government financed a grave for the girl, which represents a young tree.

Almost all Belgian soldiers who died during their internment in the Netherlands and were not repatriated, are buried or commemorated at the cemetery.
