= III Reserve Corps =

III Reserve Corps III. Reserve-Korps
- Flag of the Staff of a Generalkommando (1871–1918)
- Active: 2 August 1914 - post November 1918
- Country: German Empire
- Type: Corps
- Size: Approximately 38,000 (on formation)
- Engagements: World War I Battle of the Frontiers Siege of Antwerp First Battle of Ypres

Insignia
- Abbreviation: III RK

The III Reserve Corps (German: III. Reserve-Korps / III RK) was a corps level command of the German Army in World War I.

== Formation ==
III Reserve Corps was formed on the outbreak of the war in August 1914 as part of the mobilisation of the Army. It was initially commanded by General der Infanterie Hans von Beseler, recalled from retirement. It was still in existence at the end of the war.

=== Structure on formation ===
On formation in August 1914, III Reserve Corps consisted of two divisions, made up of reserve units. In general, Reserve Corps and Reserve Divisions were weaker than their active counterparts

Reserve Infantry Regiments did not always have three battalions nor necessarily contain a machine gun company
Reserve Jäger Battalions did not have a machine gun company on formation
Reserve Cavalry Regiments consisted of just three squadrons
Reserve Field Artillery Regiments usually consisted of two abteilungen of three batteries each
Corps Troops generally consisted of a Telephone Detachment and four sections of munition columns and trains

In summary, III Reserve Corps mobilised with 25 infantry battalions, 7 machine gun companies (42 machine guns), 6 cavalry squadrons, 12 field artillery batteries (72 guns) and 3 pioneer companies.

Corps	Division	Brigade	Units
III Reserve Corps	5th Reserve Division	9th Reserve Infantry Brigade	8th Reserve Infantry Regiment
III Reserve Corps	5th Reserve Division	9th Reserve Infantry Brigade	48th Reserve Infantry Regiment
III Reserve Corps	5th Reserve Division	10th Reserve Infantry Brigade	12th Reserve Infantry Regiment
III Reserve Corps	5th Reserve Division	10th Reserve Infantry Brigade	52nd Reserve Infantry Regiment
III Reserve Corps	5th Reserve Division	10th Reserve Infantry Brigade	3rd Reserve Jäger Battalion
III Reserve Corps	5th Reserve Division		2nd Reserve Dragoon Regiment
III Reserve Corps	5th Reserve Division		5th Reserve Field Artillery Regiment
III Reserve Corps	5th Reserve Division		4th Company, 3rd Pioneer Battalion
III Reserve Corps	5th Reserve Division		5th Reserve Divisional Pontoon Train
III Reserve Corps	5th Reserve Division		3rd Reserve Medical Company
III Reserve Corps	6th Reserve Division	11th Reserve Infantry Brigade	20th Reserve Infantry Regiment
III Reserve Corps	6th Reserve Division	11th Reserve Infantry Brigade	24th Reserve Infantry Regiment
III Reserve Corps	6th Reserve Division	12th Reserve Infantry Brigade	26th Reserve Infantry Regiment
III Reserve Corps	6th Reserve Division	12th Reserve Infantry Brigade	35th Reserve Infantry Regiment
III Reserve Corps	6th Reserve Division		3rd Reserve Uhlan Regiment
III Reserve Corps	6th Reserve Division		6th Reserve Field Artillery Regiment
III Reserve Corps	6th Reserve Division		1st Reserve Company, 3rd Pioneer Battalion
III Reserve Corps	6th Reserve Division		2nd Reserve Company, 3rd Pioneer Battalion
III Reserve Corps	6th Reserve Division		6th Reserve Divisional Pontoon Train
III Reserve Corps	6th Reserve Division		16th Reserve Medical Company
III Reserve Corps	Corps Troops		3rd Reserve Telephone Detachment
III Reserve Corps	Corps Troops		5th & 6th Reserve Munition Column Sections
III Reserve Corps	Corps Troops		5th & 6th Reserve Train Sections
III Reserve Corps	Corps Troops		2 Reserve Bakery Columns

== Combat chronicle ==
On mobilisation, III Reserve Corps was assigned to the 1st Army on the right wing of the forces that invaded France and Belgium as part of the Schlieffen Plan offensive in August 1914. It was detached from 1st Army to take part in the Siege of Antwerp thereby missing the 1st Army's early battles (Mons, Le Cateau, Marne, Aisne, Arras). With the conclusion of the siege on 10 October 1914, it was assigned to 4th Army and took part in the First Battle of Ypres.

== Commanders ==
III Reserve Corps had the following commanders during its existence:

From	Rank	Name
2 August 1914	General der Infanterie	Hans von Beseler
26 August 1915	General der Infanterie	Adolph von Carlowitz
8 August 1917	Generalleutnant	Alfred von Böckmann
5 September 1917	Generalleutnant	Anatol Graf von Bredow

== See also ==
- German Army order of battle (1914)
- Order of First Battle of Ypres

== Bibliography ==
- Cron, Hermann (2002). Imperial German Army 1914-18: Organisation, Structure, Orders-of-Battle [first published: 1937]. Helion & Co. ISBN 1-874622-70-1.
- Ellis, John; Cox, Michael (1993). The World War I Databook. Aurum Press Ltd. ISBN 1-85410-766-6.
- Histories of Two Hundred and Fifty-One Divisions of the German Army which Participated in the War (1914-1918), compiled from records of Intelligence section of the General Staff, American Expeditionary Forces, at General Headquarters, Chaumont, France 1919. The London Stamp Exchange Ltd. 1989 [1920]. ISBN 0-948130-87-3.
- The German Forces in the Field; 7th Revision, 11th November 1918; Compiled by the General Staff, War Office. Imperial War Museum, London and the Battery Press. 1995 [1918]. ISBN 978-1-870423-95-3.
