= 5th Reserve Division (German Empire) =

5th Reserve Division (5. Reserve-Division)
- Active: 1914-1919
- Country: Prussia/Germany
- Branch: Army
- Type: Infantry
- Size: Approx. 15,000
- Engagements: World War I: Battle of Mons, Siege of Antwerp, Great Retreat, Race to the Sea, Gorlice-Tarnów Offensive, 2nd Aisne, German spring offensive, Montdidier-Noyon, Somme Offensive

The 5th Reserve Division (5. Reserve-Division) was a unit of the German Army, in World War I. The division was formed on mobilization of the German Army in August 1914. The division was disbanded in 1919 during the demobilization of the German Army after World War I. The division was a reserve division of the III Reserve Corps and was raised in the Prussian Province of Brandenburg.

== Combat chronicle ==
The 5th Reserve Division began the war on the Western Front. It fought in the opening campaigns against the Belgian Army and the British Expeditionary Force, including the Battle of Mons, and participated in the Siege of Antwerp. It was in the Yser region during the Race to the Sea. In December 1914, the division was transferred to the Eastern Front. In 1915, it fought in the Gorlice-Tarnów Offensive, including in the battle for Warsaw. It remained on the Eastern Front, mainly in positional warfare along the Shchara River, throughout the rest of 1915, in 1916, and into 1917. In April 1917, the division returned to the Western Front along the heights of the Meuse River. It fought in the Second Battle of the Aisne, also known as the Third Battle of Champagne (and to the Germans, as the Double Battle on the Aisne and in the Champagne). In 1918, it fought in the German spring offensive. In June, it fought the Americans in the Battle of Montdidier-Noyon and then again in August during the Somme Offensive. Allied intelligence rated it a second class division in 1918, noting that "in the earlier years it was a very good division, but through losses and lack of reinforcements during 1918 considerably reduced its value."

== Order of battle on mobilization ==
The order of battle of the 5th Reserve Division on mobilization was as follows:

- 9.Reserve-Infanterie-Brigade
  - Brandenburgisches Reserve-Infanterie-Regiment Nr. 8
  - Brandenburgisches Reserve-Infanterie-Regiment Nr. 48
- 10.Reserve-Infanterie-Brigade
  - Brandenburgisches Reserve-Infanterie-Regiment Nr. 12
  - Brandenburgisches Reserve-Infanterie-Regiment Nr. 52
  - Reserve-Jäger-Bataillon Nr. 3
- Reserve-Dragoner-Regiment Nr. 2
- Reserve-Feldartillerie-Regiment Nr. 5
- 4.Kompanie/Pionier-Bataillon von Rauch (1. Brandenburgisches) Nr. 3

== Order of battle on April 9, 1918 ==
The 5th Reserve Division was triangularized in June 1915. Over the course of the war, other changes took place, including the formation of the artillery and signals commands. The order of battle on April 9, 1918, was as follows:

- 9.Reserve-Infanterie-Brigade
  - Brandenburgisches Reserve-Infanterie-Regiment Nr. 8
  - Brandenburgisches Reserve-Infanterie-Regiment Nr. 12
  - Brandenburgisches Reserve-Infanterie-Regiment Nr. 48
- 5.Eskadron/Dragoner-Regiment von Bredow (1. Schlesisches) Nr. 4
- Artillerie-Kommandeur 90
  - Reserve-Feldartillerie-Regiment Nr. 5
  - IV.Bataillon/Reserve-Fußartillerie-Regiment Nr. 17
- Stab Pionier-Bataillon Nr. 305
  - 2.Reserve-Kompanie/Pionier-Bataillon von Rauch (1. Brandenburgisches) Nr. 3
  - Minenwerfer-Kompanie Nr. 205
- Divisions-Nachrichten-Kommandeur 405
