= Refugees of World War I =

Belgian refugees in Roosendaal and Bergen op Zoom, bioscoopjournaal August 1914

The First World War generated population displacements of an unprecedented scale, of more than 12,000,000 civilians, (later exceeded by those of the Second World War which reached 60,000,000). The director of the civil affairs office of the Red Cross wrote at the end of the war that: “There were refugees everywhere. As if the whole world had to move or was waiting to do so”. Refugees were generated throughout all the territories affected the war, from Belgium and France to Italy, Austro-Hungary, Russia and Serbia. Numerous refugees also appeared as a consequence of the Armenian genocide in the Ottoman Empire during that period.

== See also ==
- Belgian refugees in the Netherlands during the First World War
- Refugees on the Eastern Front of World War I
