= Belgian refugees in the Netherlands during the First World War =

Belgian refugees in Roosendaal and Bergen op Zoom, bioscoopjournaal August 1914

During the First World War between 1914 and 1918, approximately one million Belgians fled across the border to the Netherlands. These refugees were both civilians who were afraid of the war and the atrocities of the German troops, and soldiers who either deserted or were cut off from their army unit.

== German advance ==
Officially Belgium, like the Netherlands, was a neutral country during the war. By 1904 the news had already leaked out that the Germans had a plan to march through Belgium to reach France. Precautionary measures were taken against this, including the introduction of conscription.

On 4 August 1914 Germany invaded Belgium without a formal declaration of war. Immediately after the invasion a stream of refugees began to head for the Netherlands. On the first day alone 52 Belgian soldiers entered the Netherlands. When, on 10 October 1914, the city of Antwerp fell to the advancing German army, an estimated 40,000 soldiers and 1 million private citizens fled to the Netherlands. Another estimate from E.H. Kossmann and H. Pirenne cites a figure of at least half a million refugees who left Antwerp, of whom hundreds of thousands went to the Netherlands. The fleeing military personnel also contained nearly 1,600 British of the 1st Royal Naval Brigade, part of the 63rd (Royal Naval) Division, who had been cut off after orders to retreat failed to reach them at the end of the Siege of Antwerp.

== Military refugees ==
According to Hague Convention of 1907, as a neutral land in a time of war the Netherlands was obliged to disarm and intern all military personnel fleeing across its borders.

The first soldiers were accommodated in an empty barracks in Alkmaar. Later, barracks in Amersfoort, Groningen, Harderwijk and Oldebroek were used to intern military personnel. The barracks in Oldebroek were given up again on 1 September 1916. In Alkmaar German soldiers were also accommodated, but because this regularly caused conflict between them and the Belgian soldiers they were moved to Kamp (Bergen) (in Dutch). To avoid being interned some military personnel attempted to flee to the United Kingdom in civilian clothes.

At Groningen, 1,500 members of the Royal Naval Division were held in the camp they dubbed HMS Timbertown, a name inspired by the wooden huts where they were quartered. The Dutch named it as "The English Camp" ("Het Engelse Kamp").

Because most barracks were too small to cope with the stream of military refugees, tent camps were swiftly erected nearby. Close to Amersfoort, Camp Zeist was constructed from wooden barracks on the orders of minister of war Nicolaas Bosboom. Officially the camp was called Internment Camp Amersfoort - Military Camp at Zeist. In 1916 the interred military personnel began the construction of a monument to show their appreciation of the hospitality received. The camp later went on to be used as the site of the Scottish Court in the Netherlands used to try those suspected of the bombing of Pan Am Flight 103 over Lockerbie, Scotland, on 21 December 1988.

From 1917 onwards separate camps were established for deserters. Additionally, separate villages were built for married soldiers nearby the camps so that their families could live in the area. Some examples of these villages were called: Albert's Dorp, Elizabeth-Dorp, Nieuwdorp, Leopold’s Dorp, Heidekamp, Boschkant en Moensdorp. The word "dorp" means "village" in Dutch.

Over the course of time a greater and greater number of interned military personnel were put to work in Dutch businesses, where most Dutch males had had to join the army as part of the conscription effort. In total 46.2% of all military personnel were employed in this manner.

On 11 November 1918 the war ended, but only once the Netherlands had signed the truce agreement could interned military personnel be released and allowed to return home.

349 Belgian military refugees are buried or commemorated at the Belgian Military Field of Honour 1914–1918, located in the Oostergaarde Cemetery of Harderwijk, Gelderland.

== Civilian refugees ==
The first civilian refugees to arrive in the Netherlands were accommodated in the provinces of Limburg, Brabant and Zeeland. The refugees - men, women, children and others in need of assistance had great difficulty moving with what they were able to bring with them. Above all Putte, Roosendaal and Bergen op Zoom received so many refugees that they had to spend their first nights on the streets.

Due to their large numbers, the refugees were distributed around the Netherlands. The other provinces had to receive refugees and distribute them over their various districts. The first negotiations on the return of 900,000 Belgian refugees began on October 12, 1914. In May 1915 there were still 105,000 civilian refugees in the Netherlands, a number which remained more or less unchanged for the rest of the war. As with the military refugees, the return of the last civilian refugees to Belgium began at the end of 1918. In January and February 1919, the last Belgian citizens returned to their country.

Initially, the government relied mainly on private citizens to take in civilian refugees, but out of fear of anti-German riots and protests among refugees, it was decided to establish guarded refugee camps. The first camp was Nunspeet. After that, camps were opened at Ede, Amersfoort, Bergen op Zoom, Roosendaal, Tilburg, Hontenisse, Baarle-Nassau, Amsterdam, Scheveningen, Oldebroek and Veenhuizen.

Gouda was a separate refugee camp. In Gouda, refugees were first housed in private homes, but at the end of October 1914 they were concentrated in vacant greenhouses at the Steensma nursery. As the greenhouses offered insufficient comfort for so many people, a temporary village was built on the front of the greenhouses, including a church, a school and a hospital. Behind the greenhouses was a village of 64 wooden houses in which approximately 350 people were accommodated. Other camps consisted of tents or barracks with living and sleeping areas.

In the camps refugees were separated into three categories according to their threat level:

- Dangerous or undesirable elements
- Less desirable "elements"
- Decent, but needy

Partly due to the use of this classification, most of the civilians preferred to return to Belgium. In the case of undesirable behaviour, civilian refugees could also be expelled in accordance with the Dutch Aliens Act of 1849.

=== Artist Leo Gestel ===
The Dutch artist Leo Gestel drew around 100 drawings of Belgian refugees. He completed them in his atelier and gave the proceeds of any sales to the national refugee committee.

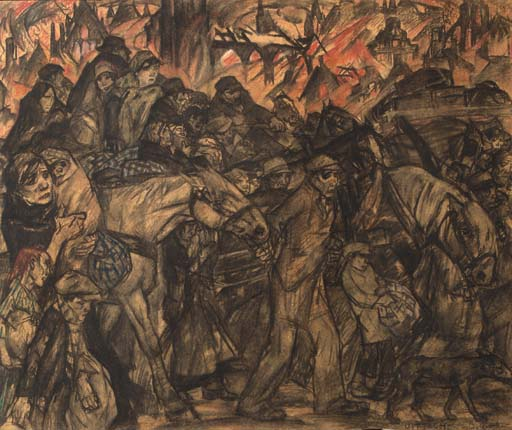

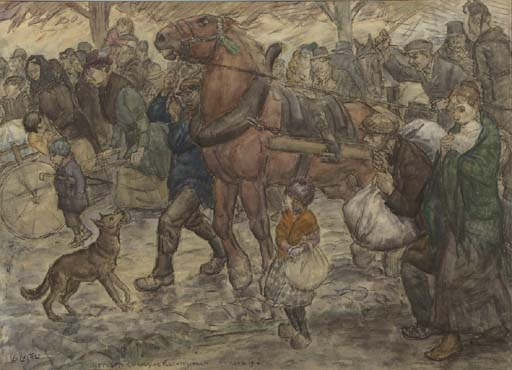

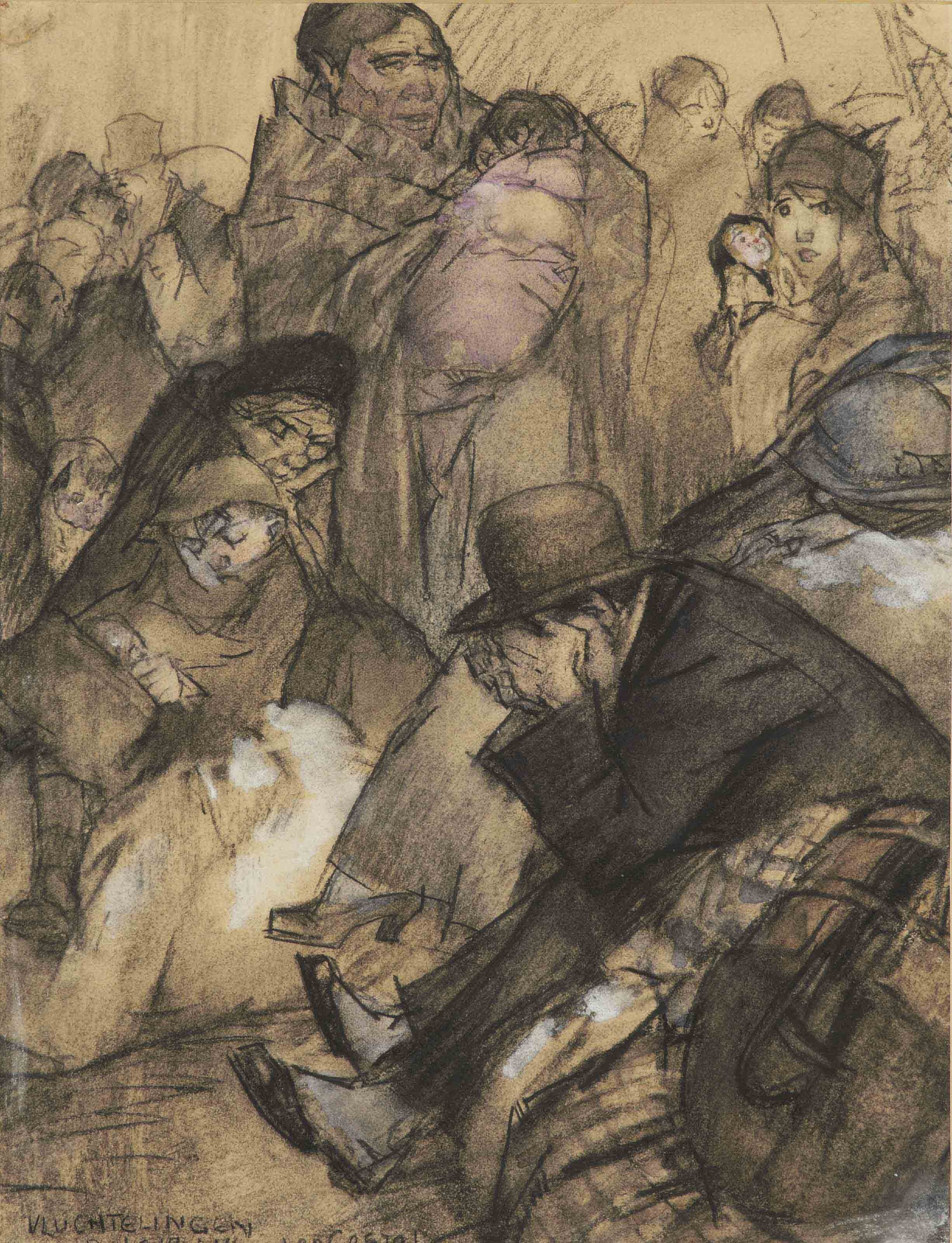

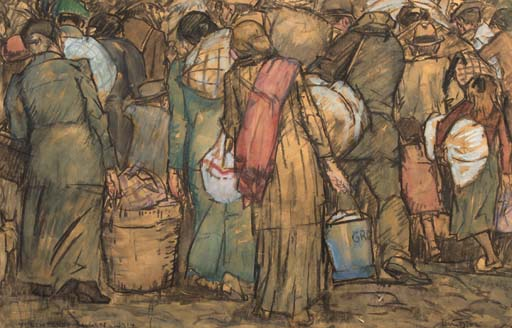

== Foreign help ==
In March 1915, Denmark donated a sum of 325,000 guilders to the Netherlands so that simple, transportable homes could be built for refugees. Help also came from the United Kingdom. The British Society of Friends (Quakers) donated large amounts for the purchase of wood for the construction of the homes and other facilities. From the United States, there was help from the Rockefeller Foundation, which paid for, amongst other things, material for making clothes. For example, the camp in Gouda received 17 sewing machines and large amounts of material. The houses were also constructed at the camps in Ede ("Danish Village"), Uden ("Villa Village"), Gouda, Amsterdam (Alida Jacobsdorp) and Zierikzee.

== Electric fence ==
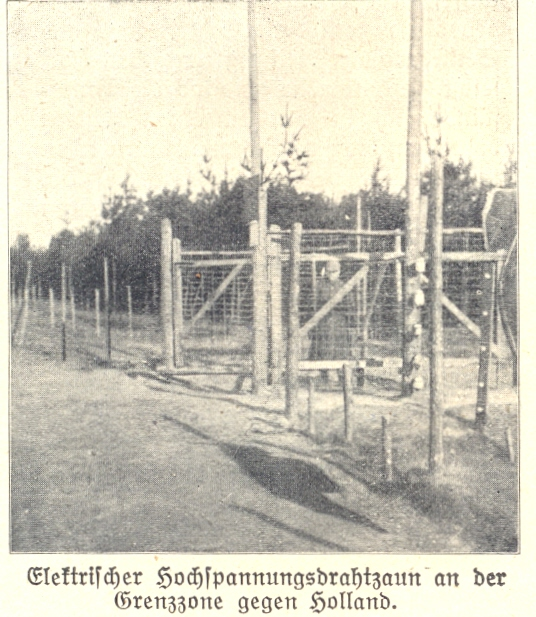
The Wire of Death electric fence along the border between Belgium and the Netherlands.

In 1915 the German army built a 332 kilometre long electric fence along the border between Belgium and the Netherlands. The high voltage electric fence was kept electrified until the end of the war. It is estimated that between 2,000 and 3,000 people, including Belgian refugees, died attempting to cross the fence.

== Literature ==
- Evelyn de Roodt, Oorlogsgasten. Vluchtelingen en krijgsgevangenen in Nederland tijdens de Eerste Wereldoorlog (Zaltbommel 2000) (in Dutch)
- Geert Laporte, Belgische geïnterneerden in Nederland gedurende de Eerste Wereldoorlog 1914-1918. Onderzoek naar de levensomstandigheden en de politieke stromingen in de kampen, Rijksuniversiteit Gent, 1980-1981 (licentiaatsverhandeling) (in Dutch)

== See also ==
- Belgian Monument (in Dutch)
- Nunspeet refugee camp (in Dutch)
