= 6th Reserve Division (German Empire) =

6th Reserve Division (6. Reserve-Division)
- Active: 1914-1918
- Country: German Empire; Prussia
- Branch: Army
- Type: Infantry
- Size: Approx. 15,000
- Engagements: World War I: Battle of Mons, Siege of Antwerp, Race to the Sea, Gorlice-Tarnów Offensive

The 6th Reserve Division (6. Reserve-Division) was a unit of the German Army, in World War I. The division was formed on mobilization of the German Army in August 1914. The division was disbanded in September 1918. The division was a reserve division of the III Reserve Corps and was raised primarily in the Prussian Province of Brandenburg.

== Combat chronicle ==
The 6th Reserve Division began the war on the Western Front. It fought in the opening campaigns against the Belgian Army and the British Expeditionary Force, including the Battle of Mons, and participated in the Siege of Antwerp. It was in the Yser region during the Race to the Sea. In December 1914, the division was transferred to the Eastern Front. In 1915, it fought in the Gorlice-Tarnów Offensive. It remained on the Eastern Front until May 1917, when it was transferred to the Verdun region. It suffered heavy losses in the French offensive that August, and was returned to the Eastern Front, occupying a quiet sector in Galicia. In March 1918, it returned to the Western Front. It was dissolved and its units and soldiers dispersed to other units in September 1918. Allied intelligence considered it as a mediocre division, and rated it third class before its dissolution in 1918.

== Order of battle on mobilization ==
The order of battle of the 6th Reserve Division on mobilization was as follows:

- 11.Reserve-Infanterie-Brigade
  - Brandenburgisches Reserve-Infanterie-Regiment Nr. 20
  - Brandenburgisches Reserve-Infanterie-Regiment Nr. 24
- 12.Reserve-Infanterie-Brigade
  - Magdeburgisches Reserve-Infanterie-Regiment Nr. 26
  - Brandenburgisches Reserve-Infanterie-Regiment Nr. 35
- Brandenburgisches Reserve-Ulanen-Regiment Nr. 3
- Reserve-Feldartillerie-Regiment Nr. 6
- 1.Reserve-Kompanie/Pionier-Bataillon von Rauch (1. Brandenburgisches) Nr. 3
- 2.Reserve-Kompanie/Pionier-Bataillon von Rauch (1. Brandenburgisches) Nr. 3

== Order of battle on March 28, 1918 ==
The 6th Reserve Division was triangularized in November 1915. Over the course of the war, other changes took place, including the formation of the artillery and signals commands. The order of battle on March 28, 1918, was as follows:

- 12.Reserve-Infanterie-Brigade
  - Brandenburgisches Reserve-Infanterie-Regiment Nr. 20
  - Brandenburgisches Reserve-Infanterie-Regiment Nr. 24
  - Brandenburgisches Reserve-Infanterie-Regiment Nr. 35
- 5.Eskadron/Ulanen-Regiment Graf zu Dohna (Ostpreußisches) Nr. 8
- Artillerie-Kommandeur 94
  - Reserve-Feldartillerie-Regiment Nr. 6
  - Fußartillerie-Bataillon Nr. 39
- Stab Pionier-Bataillon Nr. 306:
  - 1.Reserve-Kompanie/Pionier-Bataillon von Rauch (1. Brandenburgisches) Nr. 3
  - 5.Kompanie/Pionier-Bataillon Prinz Radziwill (Ostpreußisches) Nr. 1
  - Minenwerfer-Kompanie Nr. 206
- Divisions-Nachrichten-Kommandeur 406
