= Siege of Antwerp (1914) =

World War I engagement between the German and the Belgian armies

- Part of the Western Front of the First World War
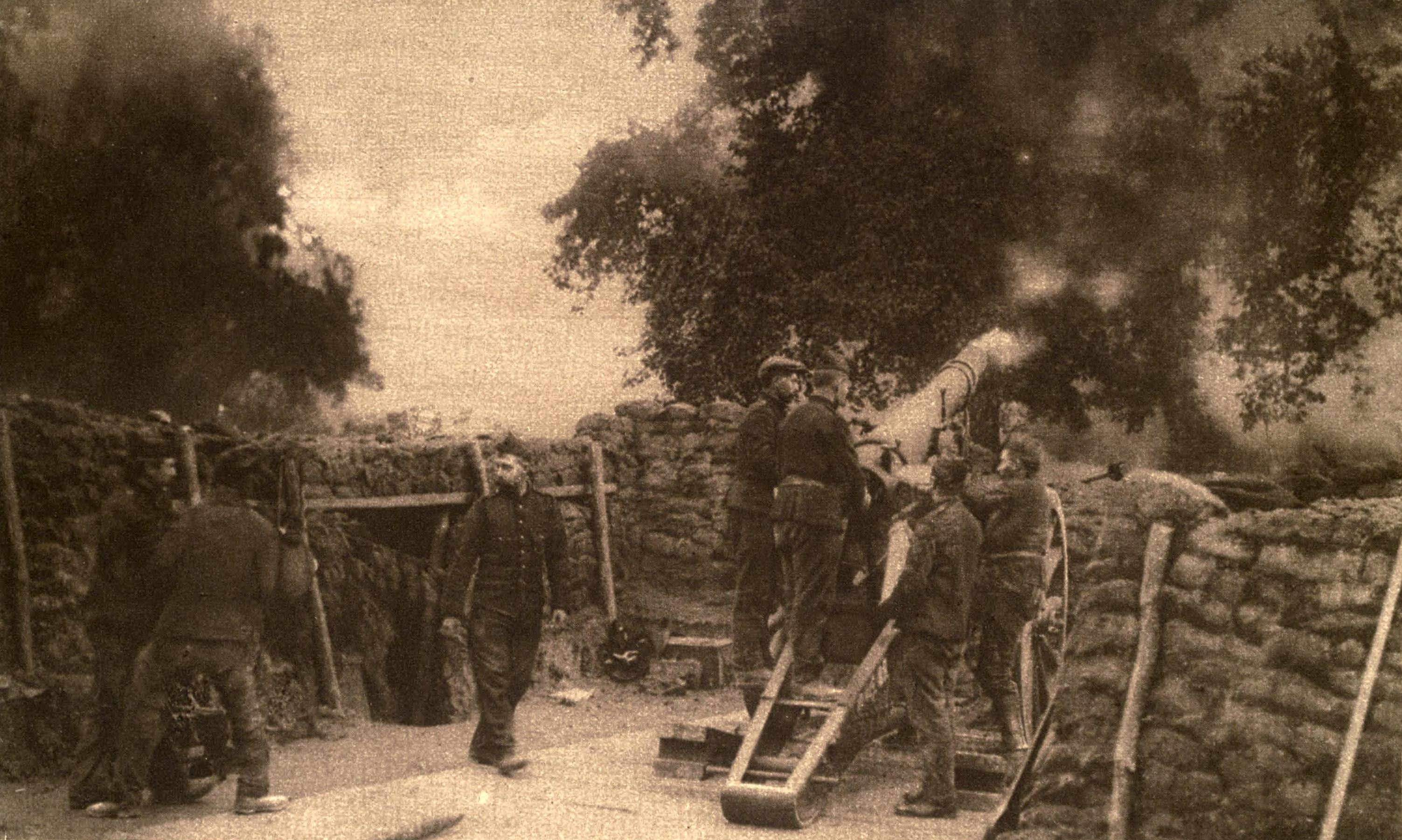
- Belgian artillery positions around Antwerp
Date	28 September – 10 October 1914 (1 week and 5 days)
Location	Antwerp, Belgium 51.22°N 4.41°E
Result	German victory
Territorial changes	City captured with garrison Belgian army withdraws west to Yser river

Belligerents
German Empire; Austria-Hungary	Belgium; United Kingdom

Commanders and leaders
(German Empire) Hans von Beseler	(Belgium) Albert I (Belgium) Victor Deguise (POW) (United Kingdom of Great Britain and Ireland) Henry Rawlinson (United Kingdom of Great Britain and Ireland) Archibald Paris

Strength
66,000 (during main assault)	87,300 field troops 63,000 garrison troops

Casualties and losses
	Belgium: 33,000 interned in the Netherlands; 30,000 captured Britain: 57 killed 1,480 interned 900 captured

The siege of Antwerp was an engagement between the German and the Belgian, British and French armies around the fortified city of Antwerp during the First World War. German troops besieged a garrison of Belgian fortress troops, the Belgian field army and the British Royal Naval Division in the Antwerp area, after the German invasion of Belgium in August 1914. The city, which was ringed by forts known as the National Redoubt, was besieged to the south and east by German forces.

The Belgian forces in Antwerp conducted three sorties in late September and early October, which interrupted German plans to send troops to France, where reinforcements were needed to counter the French armies and the British Expeditionary Force (BEF). A German bombardment of the Belgian fortifications with heavy and super-heavy artillery began on 28 September. The Belgian garrison had no hope of victory without relief; despite the arrival of the Royal Naval Division beginning on 3 October, the Germans penetrated the outer ring of forts. When the German advance began to compress a corridor from the west of the city along the Dutch border to the coast, through which the Belgians at Antwerp had maintained contact with the rest of unoccupied Belgium, the Belgian Field Army commenced a withdrawal westwards towards the coast.

On 9 October, the remaining garrison surrendered, the Germans occupied the city and some British and Belgian troops escaped to the Netherlands further north to be interned for the duration of the war. Belgian troops from Antwerp withdrew to the Yser river, close to the French border and dug in, to begin the defence of the last unoccupied part of Belgium and fought the Battle of the Yser against the German 4th Army in October and November 1914. The Belgian Army held the area until late in 1918, when it participated in the Allied liberation of Belgium. (Note: In 1915 the Belgian–Dutch border was obstructed by an electric fence built by the Germans, known as the Wire of Death.)

== Background ==
=== Strategic context ===
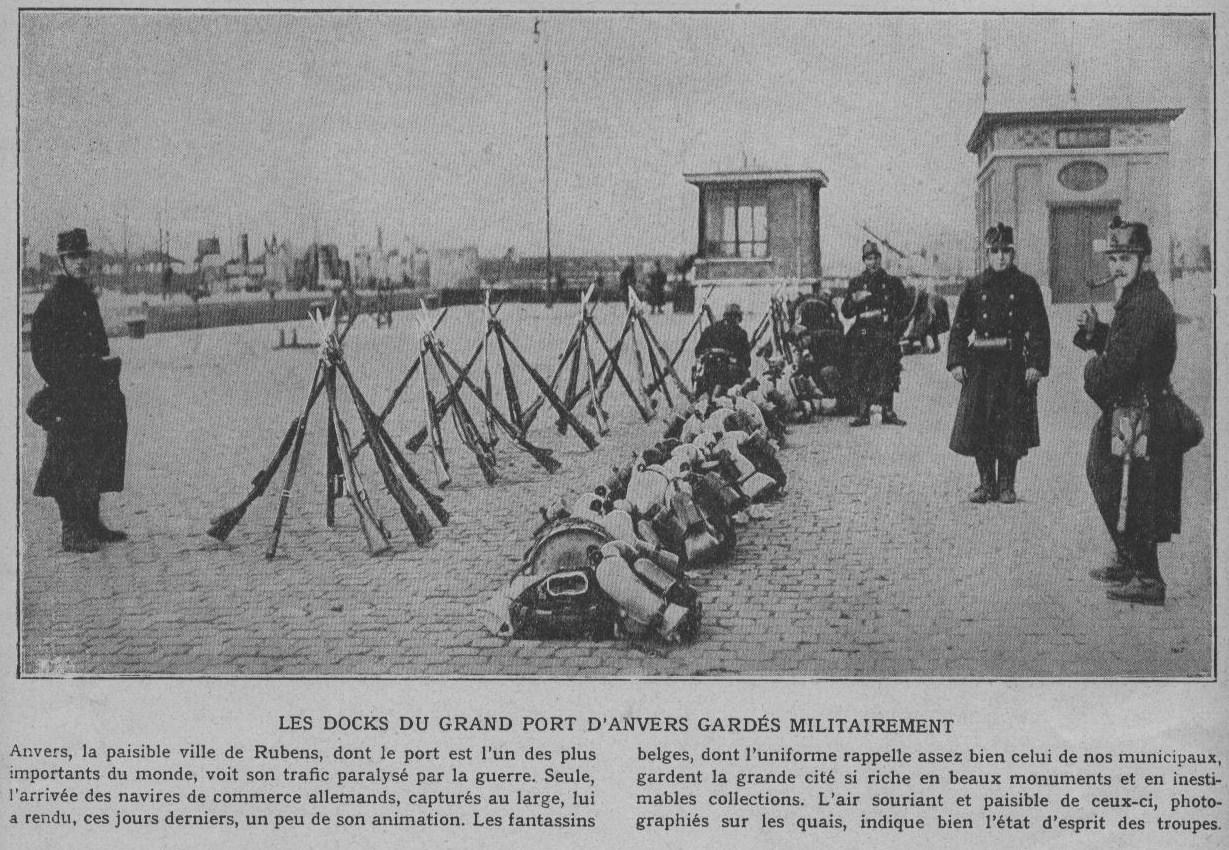
Belgian fortress troops in Antwerp, 1914

The city of Antwerp (military governor general, Victor Deguise) was defended by numerous forts and other defensive positions and was considered to be impregnable. Since the 1880s, Belgian defence planning had been based on holding barrier forts on the Meuse (Maas) at Liège and at the confluence of the Meuse and the Sambre rivers at Namur, to prevent French or German armies from crossing the river, with the option of a retreat to the national redoubt at Antwerp, as a last resort, until the European powers guaranteeing Belgian neutrality could intervene. The national redoubt consisted of a dozen older forts around 5 km (3.1 mi) outside to the city, completed in the 1860s, with an enceinte around the town abutting the Scheldt estuary at either end, with wet ditches around the enceinte and forts. The principal line of resistance comprised a ring of 21 forts, 10–15 km (6.2–9.3 mi) outside the city, which had been built after 1882. A group of two forts and three coastal batteries defended the Scheldt and there were a small number of prepared inundations. Forts built at Liège and Namur on the Meuse were of similar construction and intended to be "barrier forts and bridgeheads", a first line of defence in the event of an invasion from the east or south-east.

=== German invasion ===
On 2 August 1914, the Belgian government refused the passage of German troops through Belgium to France and on the night of 3/4 August the Belgian General Staff ordered the 3rd Division to Liège to obstruct a German advance. The German army invaded Belgium on the morning of 4 August. Covered by the 3rd Division, the Liège fortress garrison, a screen of the Cavalry Division and detachments from Liège and Namur, the rest of the Belgian Field Army closed up to the river Gete and by 4 August, the 1st Division had assembled at Tienen, the 5th Division at Perwez, the 2nd Division at Leuven and the 6th Division at Wavre, covering central and western Belgium and the communications towards Antwerp. German cavalry appeared at Visé early on 4 August and found the bridge down and Belgian troops on the west bank. The Germans found a ford, crossed the river and forced the Belgians to retire towards Liège. By the evening it was clear to the Belgian High Command that the 3rd Division and the Liège garrison were in the path of a very large invasion force.

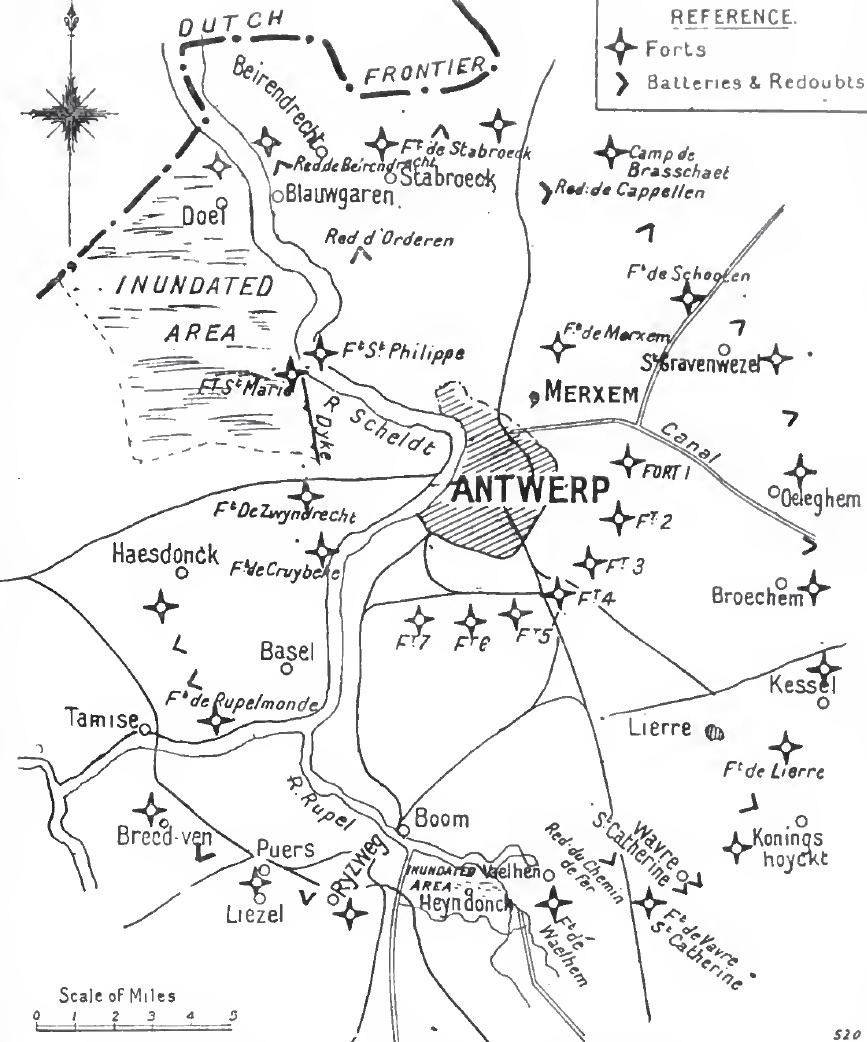
Map of the fortifications around Antwerp in August 1914

On 5 August the Battle of Liège began, when the Germans tried to capture the fortified city of Liège by a coup de main and then attempted a night attack, which collapsed in confusion until General Erich Ludendorff rallied the infantry. Ludendorff attacked again around noon on 6 August and found no opposition in the city, the Belgian 3rd Division having been withdrawn to the Gete. The Germans began a siege of the fortress, which fell on 16 August. On 10 August German cavalry reached the Gete and Jägers began to move northwards to Diest and Hasselt. On 12 August German cavalry and Jäger attacked at the Battle of Halen and were driven off after a ten-hour battle. By 17 August, a huge number of German troops had crossed into Belgium between the Meuse, Demer and Gete, despite the demolitions carried out by the Belgian Army and paramilitary Garde Civique. The Belgian position on the right (southern) flank of the Gete, was threatened by a flanking manoeuvre through Huy. On 18 August the Germans attacked again, captured Halen, entered Tienen and attacked the 1st Division frontally and on the northern flank, which the 1st Division repulsed only with great difficulty.

With information that five German corps and six reserve corps were in Belgium and with no support from the French Army and British Expeditionary Force (BEF) ready, the Belgian Field Army was ordered to withdraw towards Antwerp on the evening of 18 August. It arrived on 20 August, with little interference from German advanced parties, except for an engagement between the 1st Division and the German IX Corps near Tienen, in which the Belgians had 1,630 casualties. Brussels, the Belgian capital, was captured on 20 August, as the Belgian Field Army arrived at Antwerp. Namur fell on 24 August, at the same time that the field army made a sortie from Antwerp towards Brussels. The Belgian government of Charles de Broqueville left Brussels and moved to Antwerp to avoid capture by the Germans, who detached the III Reserve Corps from the First Army to mask the city from positions either side of the Dyle Canal. A brigade of the IV Reserve Corps was sent to occupy Brussels. The IX Reserve Corps was ordered to move to Antwerp on 22 August.

== Prelude ==
=== German plan of attack ===
As part of the war planning conducted by Schlieffen and then Moltke between 1898 and 1914, a plan had been made to isolate Antwerp, to counter the possibility that Belgian forces reinforced by British troops, would threaten the northern flank of the German armies involved in the invasion of France. The plan anticipated operations by eleven divisions from seven reserve corps on the east of the National Redoubt, where inundations were impossible. In 1914 the siege was conducted by only six divisions, one of which was needed to guard the Liège–Brussels railway between Tienen and Brussels and the ground between Brussels and Antwerp. Beseler abandoned the pre-war plan and substituted an attack from south of Antwerp, towards forts Walem, Sint-Katelijne-Waver and then an exploitation northwards in the area of forts Koningshooikt, Lier, Kessel, four intermediate works, the river Nete and an inundation 400–500 yd (370–460 m) wide. The 6th and 5th reserve, marine and 4th Ersatz divisions forced Belgian outposts back 4–5 mi (6.4–8.0 km) on 28 September and formed a covering line from the Nete to the Scheldt at Mechelen. Behind the covering line, German siege artillery was installed to the east and south of Mechelen, ready to commence a bombardment on Forts Sint-Katelijne-Waver and Walem as the Dorpveld and Bosbeek redoubts, to the north-east of Sint-Katelijne-Waver were engaged by 8 in (200 mm) mortars and the field defences between the forts, the Nete bridges and Antwerp waterworks north of Walem were bombarded by other heavy guns. (Note: The German siege train consisted of four 420 mm (17 in) Big Bertha howitzers (not to be confused with the later Paris Gun), four Austrian 205 mm (8.1 in) howitzers, five 305 mm (12.0 in) siege mortars, four Austrian 300 mm (12 in) mortars, forty-eight 210 mm (8.3 in) mortars, seventy-two 150 mm (5.9 in) howitzers and forty 100–130 mm (3.9–5.1 in) guns.)

=== Belgian defensive preparations ===
Work by Belgian engineers to construct field defences around Antwerp had gone on since the beginning of the war, building positions in the intervals between the forts, inundations formed and the foreground cleared of obstructions. The clearances proved unwise, since they made the forts visible, trenches could only be dug 1 ft (0.30 m) deep, because of the high water-table and had no overhead cover. During the German advance to Mechelen, most of the Belgian Army occupied the 4th Sector between the 3rd Sector and the Scheldt, only light forces held the 3rd Sector and the 4th Division held the sector around Dendermonde. The 1st and 2nd divisions were sent to the 3rd Sector and the 5th Division took up reserve positions behind them.

== Siege ==
=== First sortie, 24–26 August ===
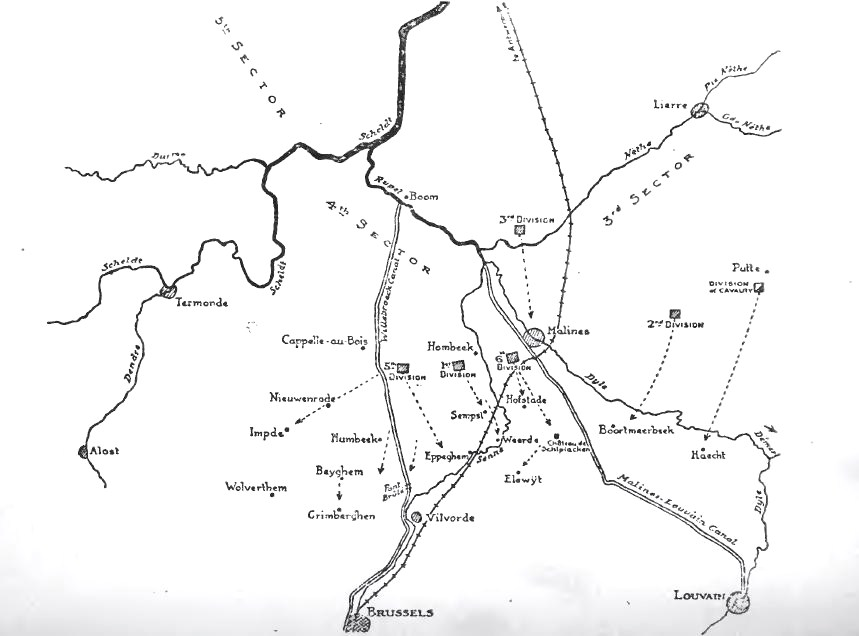
Antwerp: first sortie, 25–26 August

The Belgian Army made a first sortie from Antwerp to help French and British troops engaged in fighting at the Sambre and at the Mons Canal. The operation was intended to distract the III Reserve and IX Reserve corps observing Antwerp and to cut German communications through Leuven and Brussels. After reconnaissance on 24 August, four divisions advanced southwards from Mechelen the next day, leaving one division of infantry and the Cavalry Division in reserve. The sortie was halted on 26 August, after receiving news of the withdrawal of the French and British and that Joseph Joffre, commander of the French army, did not intend to attack immediately and the Belgian forces returned to Antwerp.

On the night of 25/26 August, the city was bombed by a German Zeppelin airship. Ten Belgian civilians were killed but the bombing failed to undermine the morale of the garrison. By 27 August reports to OHL led Moltke to believe that the Belgian army had lost its offensive capacity and ordered the brigade of the IV Reserve Corps at Brussels, to move south to rejoin the corps at Péronne. On 2 September German intelligence sources in Brussels reported that c. 40,000 British troops had landed at Ostend, occupied the coast westwards to Boulogne and reinforced the Belgian Army in Antwerp. Beseler attacked on 4 September, with three divisions on either side of the Scheldt towards Termonde, which captured the fortress and blew the bridges to the north.

=== Second sortie, 9–13 September ===
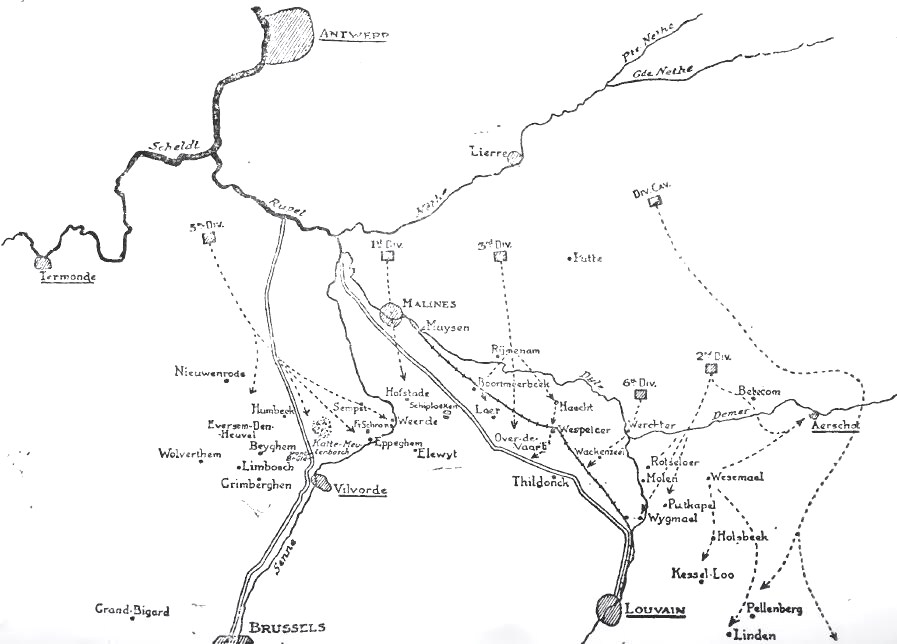
Antwerp: second sortie, 9–13 September

After the end of the first sortie, the Belgian field army joined the fortress troops in improving the defences between the forts, while the German besiegers consolidated their positions on an east–west line, about 8 mi (13 km) north of Brussels and 4–5 mi (6.4–8.0 km) away from the outer forts. On 31 August Beseler was made responsible for the security of the German forces around Antwerp from relief attempts from the west. Landsturm battalions were transferred from the Generalgouverneur appointed to administer occupied Belgium, Field Marshal Von der Goltz and a division of the Marinekorps was ordered to the area.

On 1 September, the Belgians received information that the Germans were preparing to advance towards the Belgian western flank, on the Scheldt at Dendermonde. The Belgian commanders had received reports that the IX Reserve Corps and the 6th Division of the III Reserve Corps, were being relieved by the Marine Division and Landwehr troops. The Germans had received agent reports of an imminent sortie from Antwerp, troops concentrations in western Belgium and northern France and the arrival of more British troops at Ostend. With the concentration of more troops and Landsturm at Brussels underway, the reports caused no alarm.

The Belgian Army Command considered that the German attack on 4 September was a feint and began to plan another sortie, to induce the Germans to recall the troops being transferred to France and to disrupt German communications in central Belgium. German troop withdrawals were observed from 5–7 September. A frontal attack was considered to be impossible given the extent of the German trenches but an attack on the eastern flank was considered possible. Two divisions were to remain inside the Antwerp defences, while three divisions and cavalry were to attack towards Aarschot. Important crossings over the Demer and Dyle rivers were quickly taken, Aarschot was captured and by 10 September, the cavalry reached the city of Leuven. The German 6th Reserve Division and IX Reserve Corps were recalled to the region, joining the 30th Division of XV Corps from Alsace, which conducted operations against the sortie between 10–13 September around Brussels. The Belgian advance was stopped and the army retired to Antwerp on 13 September. (Note: The diversion of the troops moving south from Belgium and of the 30th Division had no effect on the Battle of the Marne, as the German retreat had begun on 9 September but the advanced troops of the units from Belgium reached the Aisne on 14 September and the Oise on 16 September, where they opposed the Allied counter-offensive on the Aisne.)

=== Third sortie, 26–27 September ===
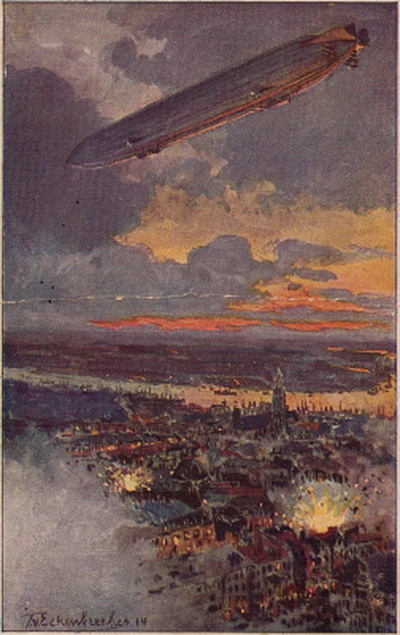
German Zeppelin airships during the bombing on Antwerp during the night of the 25/6 August.

At Antwerp, the German concentration of troops on the south-eastern side of the line had left a gap to the north from the Dender to the Dutch frontier. The gap spanned about 13 mi (21 km) at the confluence of the Dender and the Scheldt rivers at Dendermonde, through which the defenders of Antwerp retained contact with western Belgium and the Allied forces operating on the coast and in northern France. After the Siege of Maubeuge in France, German super-heavy artillery was moved towards Antwerp which like Liège and Namur, would be untenable unless it could be incorporated into the main Allied front line, like the fortified regions of Verdun and Belfort in France. On 25 September the French General Staff (GQG) requested another sortie from Antwerp.

The Belgian General Staff began to plan another operation. Signs of German preparations for a general attack on Antwerp, led to the forces intended for the sortie being reduced. The 5th Division, elements of the 4th Division and the Cavalry Division, which held the defences on the west side of the National Redoubt at Dendermonde and the Waasland, attacked German troops moving westward from Aalst. Although they succeeded in making a small advance, a counter-attack by Landwehr Brigade 37, supported by heavy artillery, led to the cancelling of the assault. On 28 September, the German bombardment of the Antwerp fortresses began.

== Battle ==
=== Bombardment ===
The German bombardment began on 28 September, with German siege guns directed by observation balloons on gun emplacements, flanking positions and magazines, which were the most vital parts of the forts, had by 6:00 p.m. on 29 September with extraordinary accuracy, made Fort Sint-Katelijne-Waver untenable and extensively damaged Fort Walem. Preparations to evacuate the Belgian Army to Ostend were begun by the Belgian Army Headquarters on 29 September and wounded, recruits, untrained men, prisoners of war, transport, equipment, ammunition and industrial machinery were gradually moved from Antwerp. The route out of the city crossed the Scheldt on two narrow pontoon bridges at the city centre and at Burcht. Trains had to run south along the right bank, cross the Rupel near German infantry positions only 10,000 yd (5.7 mi; 9.1 km) from the siege guns at Mechelen and then cross the railway bridge at Temse 12 mi (19 km) away. From 29 September – 7 October trains with lights extinguished, ran each night unopposed. The 4th Division assembled at Dendermonde, where a German attack was expected and the Cavalry Division guarded the river line, to protect the escape route between the Dender and the coast. Early on 29 September, the Belgian Prime Minister, Charles de Broqueville, informed the British that if all the outer forts were lost, the government and field army of 65,000 men would withdraw to Ostend and leave the 80,000 fortress troops to hold Antwerp for as long as possible. The next day, de Broqueville formally appealed to the British and French governments for help.

=== German attack ===
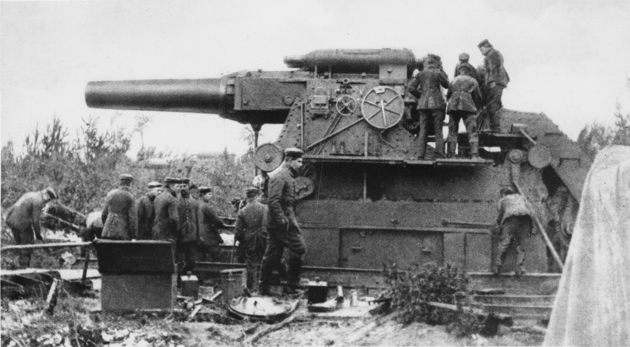
A 420 mm Gamma Mörser, of the type used to bombard Antwerp forts in 1914

On 1 October the German attack began on Forts Sint-Katelijne-Waver, Walem and the Bosbeek and Dorpveld redoubts by the 5th Reserve and Marine divisions. By 11:00 a.m. Fort Walem was severely damaged, Fort Lier had been hit by a 16 in (410 mm) shell, Fort Koningshooikt and the Tallabert and Bosbeek redoubts were mostly intact and the intervening ground between Fort Sint-Katelijne-Waver and Dorpveld redoubt had been captured. A counter-attack had failed and the 4th Division had been reduced to 4,800 infantry. The Belgian commanders ordered the left flank of the army to withdraw to another line of defence north of the Nete, which covered the gap in the outer defences and kept the city out of range of German super-heavy artillery. Proclamations warning the inhabitants that King Albert I and his Government would leave Antwerp, were put up during the day.

Fort Sint-Katelijne-Waver and Dorpveld redoubt were taken during the night of 1/2 October but Walem and the Bosbeek redoubt were not captured until the afternoon of 2 October, after every available German gun was used to bombard them. German bombardment of gun emplacements, destruction of magazines and the exhaustion of Belgian ammunition led to Forts Walem and Koningshooikt falling to the Germans and the evacuation or surrender of the remaining defences in the 3rd Sector except for the Duffel redoubt. The Belgian 2nd Division at the east side of the 3rd Sector, began to retire across the Nete at noon and an hour later the 1st Division began to withdraw to an unfinished intermediate position, from Rumst 2 mi (3.2 km) north-west of Fort Walem to Duffel and Lisp, 1 mi (1.6 km) above Lier, which had bridgeheads at Duffel, Anderstad and Lier. The 2nd Division was relieved by the 5th Division and went into reserve. No attempt was made by the Germans to pursue during the retirements, despite the inundations on the south bank of the Nete being only 8–12 in (200–300 mm) deep and patrols reported that no attempt had been made to cut the line of retreat from Antwerp.

The Duffel redoubt was evacuated on 3 October after the garrison ran out of ammunition and German artillery-fire was switched to Fort Kessel on the flank of the break-in. Next day German super-heavy guns began to bombard the fort, which forced the garrison to abandon the fort and German preparations for an attack on the line of the Nete were made, opposite Lier at the junction of the Grote and Kleine Nete and Duffel. The Royal Marine Brigade arrived opposite Lier in requisitioned London buses on 4 October and occupied a position around the northern fringe of Lier, which turned out to be sections of a shallow trench between hedgerows, with one strand of wire in front. Some skirmishing took place in the town and the position was bombarded by German artillery, against which the British had no reply except from an armoured train. German attacks between the Grote and Kleine Nete forced back the defenders and crossed the Dender; attempts were made to cross the Scheldt at Schoonaarde and Dendermonde.

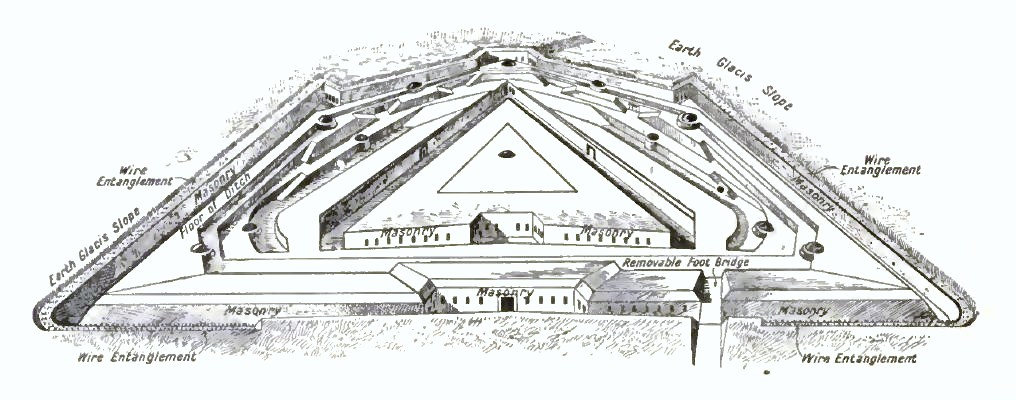
Pentagonal Brialmont fort, 1914

At dawn on 5 October, two German battalions of Reserve Infantry Regiment 26 crossed the Nete at Anderstad farm, 1 mi (1.6 km) below Lier, under cover of enfilade fire from the outskirts of Lier, using a trestle bridge built in a creek nearby. The crossing-point was screened from view by vegetation and the two battalions were able to hold the river bank until dark when two more battalions crossed the river. Attacks at Lier had taken the town up to the line of the Kleine Nete and on the flank had reached the line of the inundations. German artillery commenced a bombardment of Fort Broechem to the north, which was devastated and evacuated on 6 October. The Belgian commanders decided to continue the defence of Antwerp, since the German advance had not brought the inner forts and the city within range of the German heavy artillery. Orders for a counter-attack against the German battalions on the north bank were not issued until 1:15 a.m. on 6 October and did not arrive in time to all of the Belgian and British units in the area. Attacks made at local initiative by some Belgian units which recaptured some ground before being repulsed. The defenders withdrew to another unfinished position midway between the Nete and the inner forts, from Vremde 5 mi (8.0 km) south-east of the centre of Antwerp, to the Lier–Antwerp road and then south-west around Kontich during the day. The Marine Brigade moved to trenches north of the Lier–Antwerp road, under command of the Belgian 2nd Division.

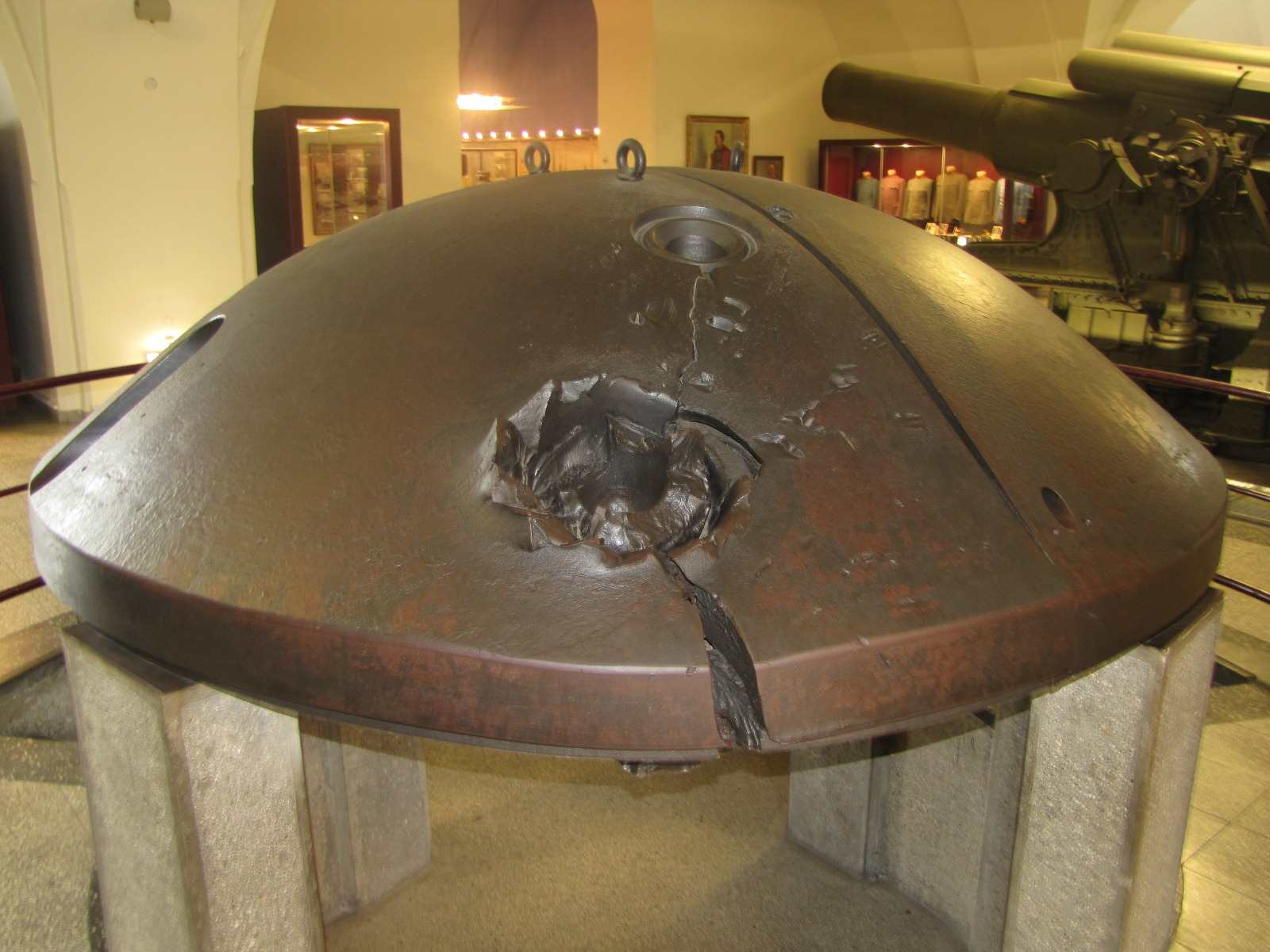
A metal cupola from Fort Kessel, split by a direct hit from a 305 mm shell (Heeresgeschichtliches Museum, Vienna)

On the western flank at Dendermonde on the Scheldt, 18 mi (29 km) south of Antwerp, Landwehr Brigade 37 was reinforced by Reserve Ersatz Brigade 1 and attempted to cross the river from 5–6 October at Schoonaarde, Dendermonde and Baasrode, 3 mi (4.8 km) downstream but were repulsed. By the afternoon of 6 October the 3rd and 6th divisions still held ground in front of the outer forts, between Fort Walem and the Scheldt to the south-west of Antwerp and around to the west but in the south and south-east the German attack had reached a line within 5–6 mi (8.0–9.7 km) of the city, which would be in range of the German guns as soon as they were brought across the Nete. The 6th Division was moved through Temse to reinforce the 4th Division and the Cavalry Division, which was guarding the escape corridor to the west. Two British naval brigades had arrived early on 6 October to reinforce the Marine Brigade but were diverted to forts 1–8 of the inner ring, where the trenches were again found to be shallow and the ground cleared for 500 yd (460 m) in front which made them easily visible to German artillery observers.

In northern France, German troops engaged in mutual outflanking attempts, from the Aisne northwards since September, had reached Arras. Lens was captured by I Bavarian Reserve Corps on 5 October. Three German cavalry corps had attempted another flanking manoeuvre to the north and IV Cavalry Corps had reached Zwartberg and Mont des Cats near Ypres. The advance of the German army threatened to block the western retreat route of the Belgian army out of Antwerp. On 6 October discussions between the British and Belgians, led to a decision to withdraw the field army to the west bank of the Scheldt, where it could maintain contact with a relieving force and avoid the danger of being trapped on the east bank. On the night of 6/7 October the 1st, 3rd and 5th divisions crossed the river and joined the Cavalry, 4th and 6th divisions, as the eight forts of the inner ring were taken over by fortress troops. Intervening trenches between forts 2 and 7 were occupied by the two British naval brigades and the 4th and 7th Fortress regiments, with the Belgian 2nd Division and British Marine Brigade in reserve. The British forces under the command of Major-General Archibald Paris, were ordered by First Lord of the Admiralty, Winston Churchill, to continue the defence for as long as possible and to be ready to cross to the west bank rather than participate in a surrender.

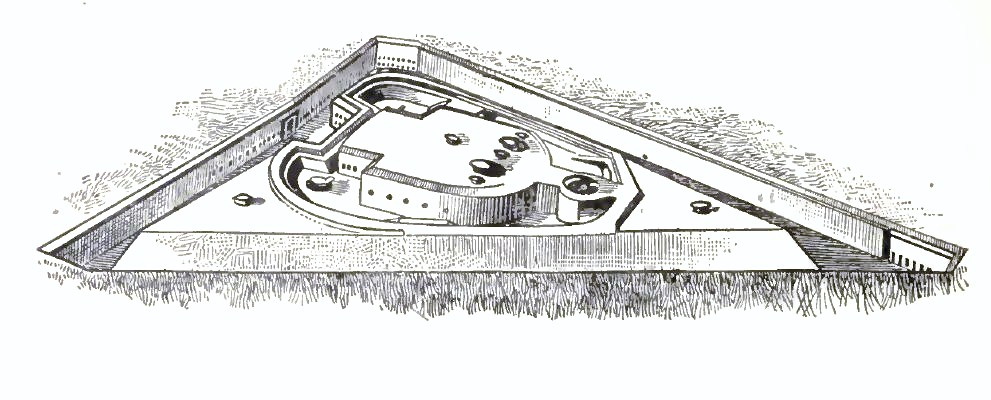
Triangular Brialmont fort, 1914

Early on 7 October, two battalions of Landwehr Regiment 37 were able to cross the Scheldt at Schoonaerde by boat, during a thick fog. The Belgian 6th Division made several counter-attacks which were repulsed and a bridge was built by the evening over which the rest of the Landwehr crossed. The width of the escape route from Antwerp had been reduced to fewer than 12 mi (19 km), which led to the Belgian commanders ordering the field army to retreat behind the Terneuzen Canal, which ran from Ghent northwards to the Dutch border. The 1st and 5th divisions, which had lost most casualties and a brigade each of the 3rd and 6th divisions moved first and the remaining troops less the 2nd Division in Antwerp, formed a flank guard on the Scheldt and the Durme. The Belgian army headquarters moved to Zelzate 25 mi (40 km) further west. A Belgian improvised brigade was at Ghent and British troops in the area were requested to move to Ghent, after a German cavalry division was reported to be near Kruishoutem 12 mi (19 km) to the south-west. Later in the day German troops entered fort Broechem and the Massenhoven redoubt to the north unopposed, which widened the gap in the Antwerp defence perimeter to 14 mi (23 km) and began to move German super-heavy artillery over the Nete, which took until 8 October. At 11:25 p.m. on 7 October German 6 in (150 mm) howitzers began to bombard the city.

By the night of 7 October the Belgian 2nd Division, the Royal Naval Division and the fortress garrison held the line of the inner forts at Antwerp, the Belgian field army was moving west between Ghent and the coast, a French naval brigade was en route to Ghent and the British 7th Division had concentrated at Bruges. Further west in a gap 50 mi (80 km) wide to the south-west of Ghent, Allied cavalry covered the ground between Lens and Hazebrouck, against three German cavalry divisions probing westwards. On 8 October at Antwerp, Landwehr Brigade 37 was reinforced by Bavarian Landwehr Brigade 1 and Ersatz Brigade 9 from the 4th Ersatz Division, which was being relieved by the Marine Division. The German attack pushed forward 8 mi (13 km), which was close to Lokeren and also 8 mi (13 km) from the Dutch border. German air reconnaissance had reported that roads west of Antwerp were clear and many people were moving north towards the frontier, which was assumed to mean that the Belgian army was not trying to escape to the west. The Belgian command had expected to withdraw the 1st and 5th divisions by rail but a lack of rolling stock led to most troops moving by road, while the 2nd Division remained in Antwerp, the 3rd Division was at Lokeren, the 4th, 6th divisions were on either flank and the Cavalry Division was to the west, covering the railway to Ghent.

=== Belgian withdrawal ===
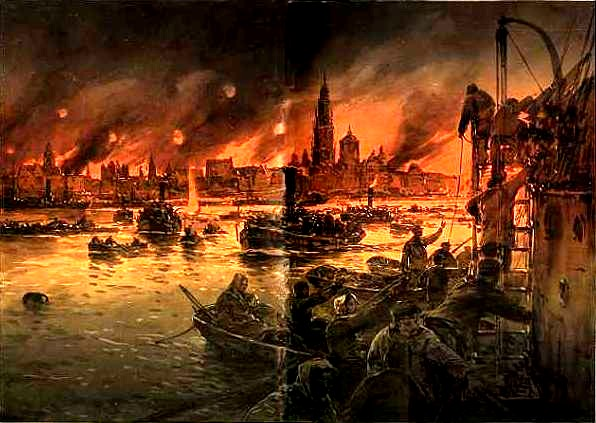
Belgian and British soldiers trying to reach the Netherlands by boat. Painting by Willy Stöwer

The 4th and 6th divisions began to retire during the day, although delayed by the German advance to Lokeren and during the night of 8/9 October, most of the field army moved west of the Ghent–Zelzate Canal, with rearguards from Loochristy northwards; the 4th Brigade moved to Ghent, where French Fusiliers Marins arrived in the morning. The British 7th Division moved from Bruges to Ostend, to cover the landing of the 3rd Cavalry Division, parts of which arrived on 8 October. By the night of 8/9 October, the Belgian field army had escaped from Antwerp and had assembled north-west of Ghent, which was garrisoned by three Allied brigades; at Ostend 37 mi (60 km) from Ghent, were the British 7th Division and the 3rd Cavalry Division. At Lokeren, the German attack on Antwerp had begun to close the escape route and at Antwerp, German heavy artillery had been moved across the Nete to bombard forts 3–5 of the inner ring and the city.

Fires could not be put out after the waterworks had been hit; rampart gates on the enceinte (main defensive wall) where the wet ditches were bridged were also bombarded. The shelling of forts 3–5 caused little damage but forts 1 and 2 facing east, were attacked by Landwehr Brigade 26 to outflank forts 8–5, which faced south to cut off the garrisons. Erroneous reports to the Belgian and British commanders before dawn on 8 October that forts 1, 2 and 4 had fallen, led to a decision that if they were not recaptured, the inner line would be abandoned at dusk and the defenders withdrawn to the city ramparts. The ramparts were earth parapets with shelters underneath and had caponiers (passages) protruding on the flanks, with moats 60 yd (55 m) wide and 10–15 ft (3.0–4.6 m) deep in front.

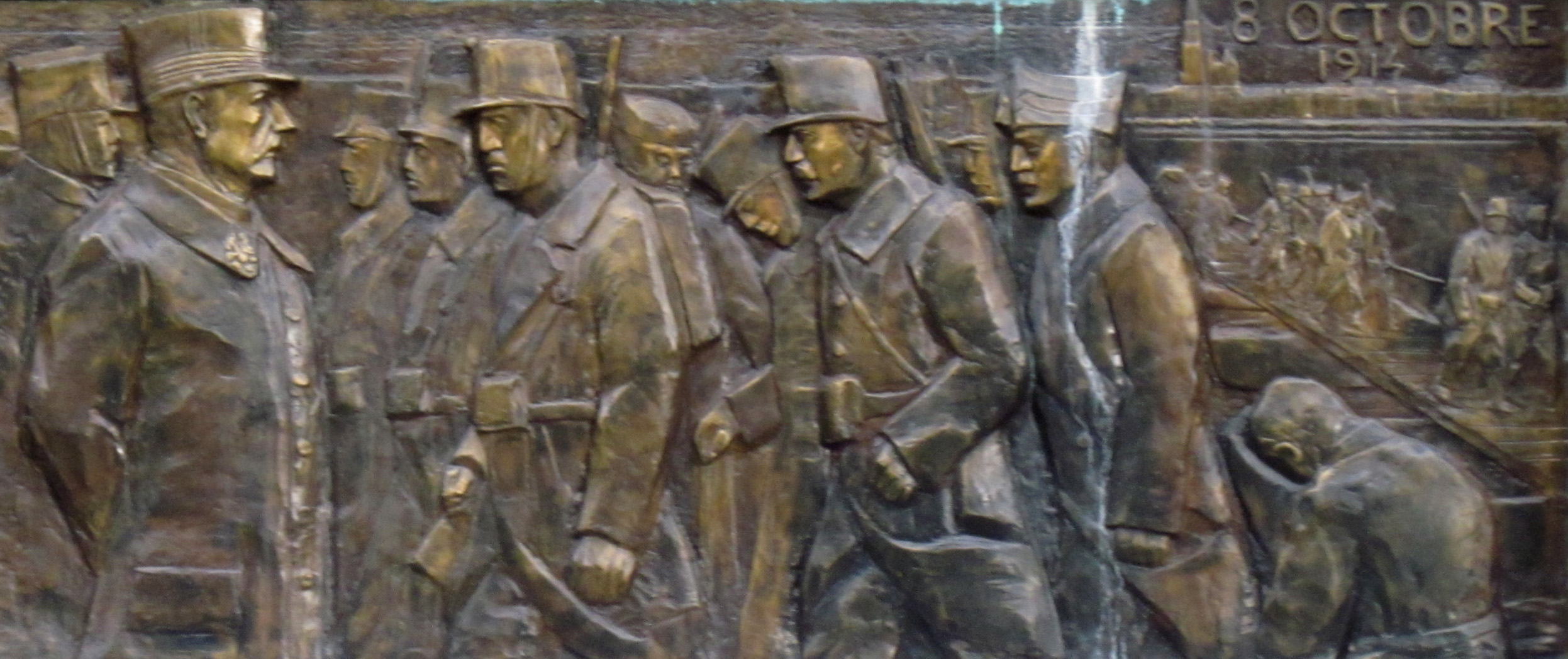
Belgian relief, depicting General Émile Dossin supervising the withdrawal from Antwerp

The Belgian and British commanders decided to continue the defence of Antwerp with the garrison troops and move the Belgian 2nd Division and the British troops across the Scheldt, when the erroneous report was corrected and it was decided that if forts 1 and 2 were lost, the Royal Naval Division would withdraw at dusk. News arrived that the forts had fallen at 5:00 p.m. and orders were sent to the Belgian 2nd Division and the British to retire. The Belgian division withdrew in stages between 6:30 p.m. and 8:00 p.m. and crossed the Scheldt by 11:30 p.m. The British began to retire at 7:00 p.m. but the orders failed to reach all of the 1st Naval Brigade, only one battalion of which withdrew. At 9:30 p.m. the mistake was realised as the rest of the division began to cross the river from 10:00–11:30 p.m. and moved west parallel to the Dutch frontier. The 1st Naval Brigade reached the Scheldt at midnight, only to find that the bridges were being demolished and under a German shrapnel bombardment. The troops crossed using barges and boats and set out for a rendezvous at Zwijndrecht, which was reached at 4:00 a.m. on 9 October. The British moved on to Sint-Gillis-Waas, where information arrived that the Germans had cut the railway at Moerbeke. The British commander Commodore Henderson, decided to head for the Dutch border to the north and at 10:00 p.m. c. 1,500 men, half the original complement were interned and about forty stragglers managed to sneak along the border and escape.

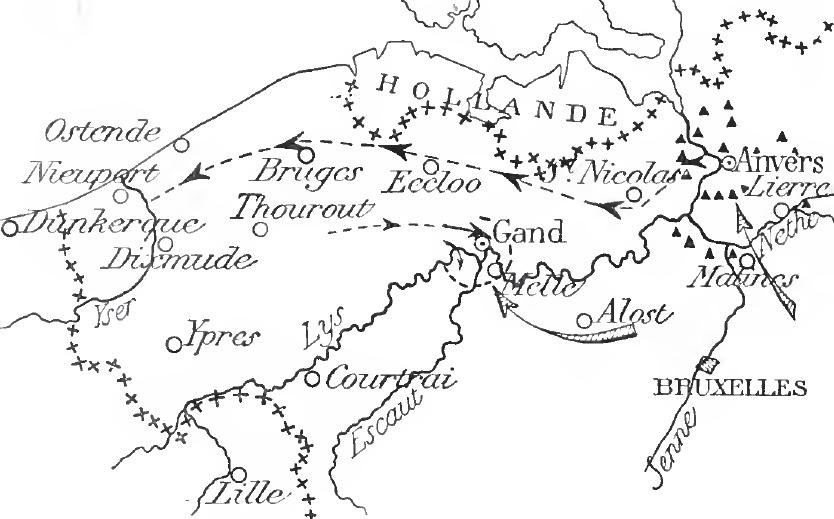
Fall of Antwerp and the Allied retreat, 1914

The British forces in Belgium were instructed on 8 October to cover the retirement of the Belgians and British from Antwerp to Ghent, Zelzate, Ostend, Torhout and Diksmuide and then join the left flank of the BEF, as it advanced into Flanders. On 9 October most of the 7th Division moved to join the French and Belgian forces at Ghent, as the 3rd Cavalry Division and the rest of the 7th Division assembled at Bruges; the French 87th Territorial Division was ordered to stop its move to Antwerp at Poperinghe. The British forces came under the command of the BEF as IV Corps, with the 8th Division once it arrived from England (11 November). The BEF II Corps was assembling at Abbeville and Rawlinson, the commander of the new IV Corps, was instructed to hold on at Ghent for as long as possible. The retirement from Antwerp proceeded satisfactorily and no German troops were seen west of Aalst, 15 mi (24 km) south-east of Ghent. A German force encountered at Melle 4 mi (6.4 km) from Ghent on the night of 9/10 October was driven off with many casualties by the French marines.

A conference between the Belgians, French and British at Ostend on 10 October, decided to hold Ghent as the Belgian field army continued its retirement. By nightfall the 1st, 3rd and 4th divisions were at Ostend, the 5th and 6th divisions were at Torhout and Diksmuide and the Antwerp garrison troops were in an area north-west of Ghent. The German besiegers had not discovered the retirement and the 4th Ersatz Division and Landwehr troops at Lokeren and Moerbeke, turned east towards the city before the withdrawal was discovered. The III Reserve Corps and the 4th Ersatz Division were then ordered to turn west and advance on Kortrijk. The move was to prolong the main German front, before being sent towards Ghent and Bruges, with orders to reach Blankenberge and Ostend on the coast. On 11 October, German troops were detected advancing on Ghent but by then the Belgian fortress troops had joined the field army and a staged withdrawal from Ghent from 3:00–10:00 p.m. had begun, after which German troops entered the city. Several bridges were demolished during the retirement, although crowds of civilians on the main road and rail bridges led to those not being destroyed.

=== Capitulation ===
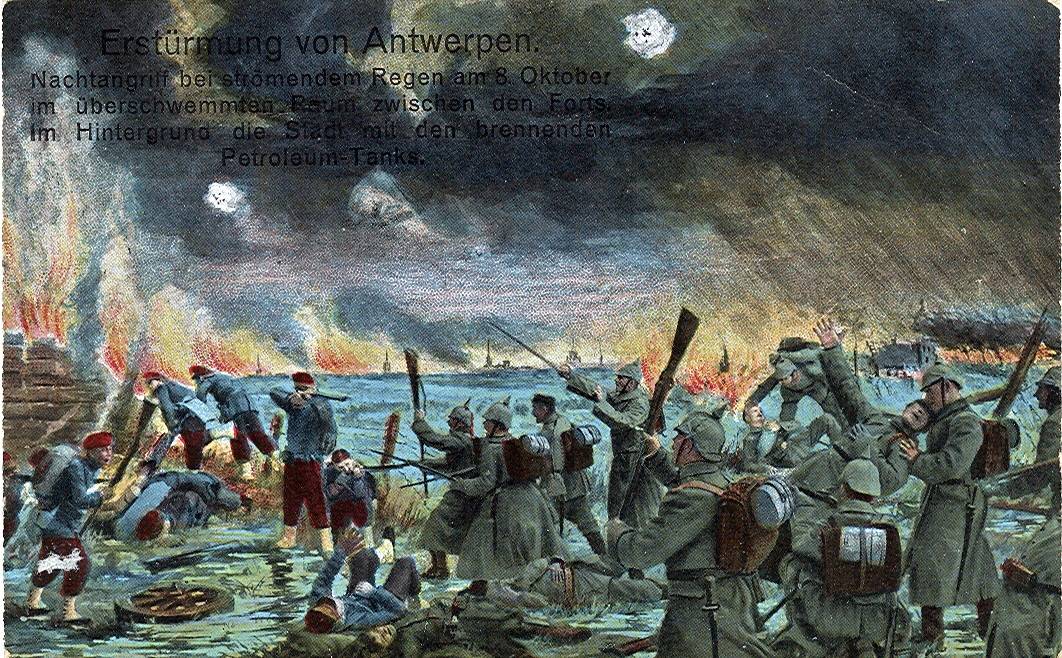
Postcard depicting German soldiers, during the assault on Antwerp on 8 October

Early on 9 October German troops found some of the forts of the inner ring empty; Beseler had the bombardment stopped and summoned the Military Governor, General Deguise to surrender. As German parlementaires made their way to Antwerp, four civilian representatives, including the Mayor of Antwerp, Jan De Vos, reached Beseler at Kontich, to request an end to the bombardment of the city. During the afternoon, under threat of a resumption of the bombardment, the civilian representatives signed a capitulation of the city and such fortresses which continued to hold out. On the morning of 10 October, when the Chief of Staff of the Military Governor appeared with authority to discuss surrender, he was presented with a fait accompli and had to agree to the terms already accepted.

The last c. 30,000 men of the Antwerp garrison surrendered and the city was occupied by German troops until November 1918. 33,000 soldiers of the Antwerp garrison fled north to the Netherlands, where they were interned for the rest of the war, as far as possible from the Belgian border, for fear of compromising Dutch neutrality. The British troops were interned at Groningen and the Belgians were accommodated at Zeist, Gaasterland, Amersfoort, and Oldebroek. The internees were employed in various industries. Germans who crossed the frontier were interned at Bergen. About one million civilian refugees left in 1914 for Great Britain, the Netherlands and France; most returned after the siege but a sizeable number of the refugees in the Netherlands remained after 1918. Several Belgian military refugees are nowadays buried or commemorated at the Belgian Military Field of Honour 1914–1918 in Harderwijk.

== Aftermath ==
=== Analysis ===
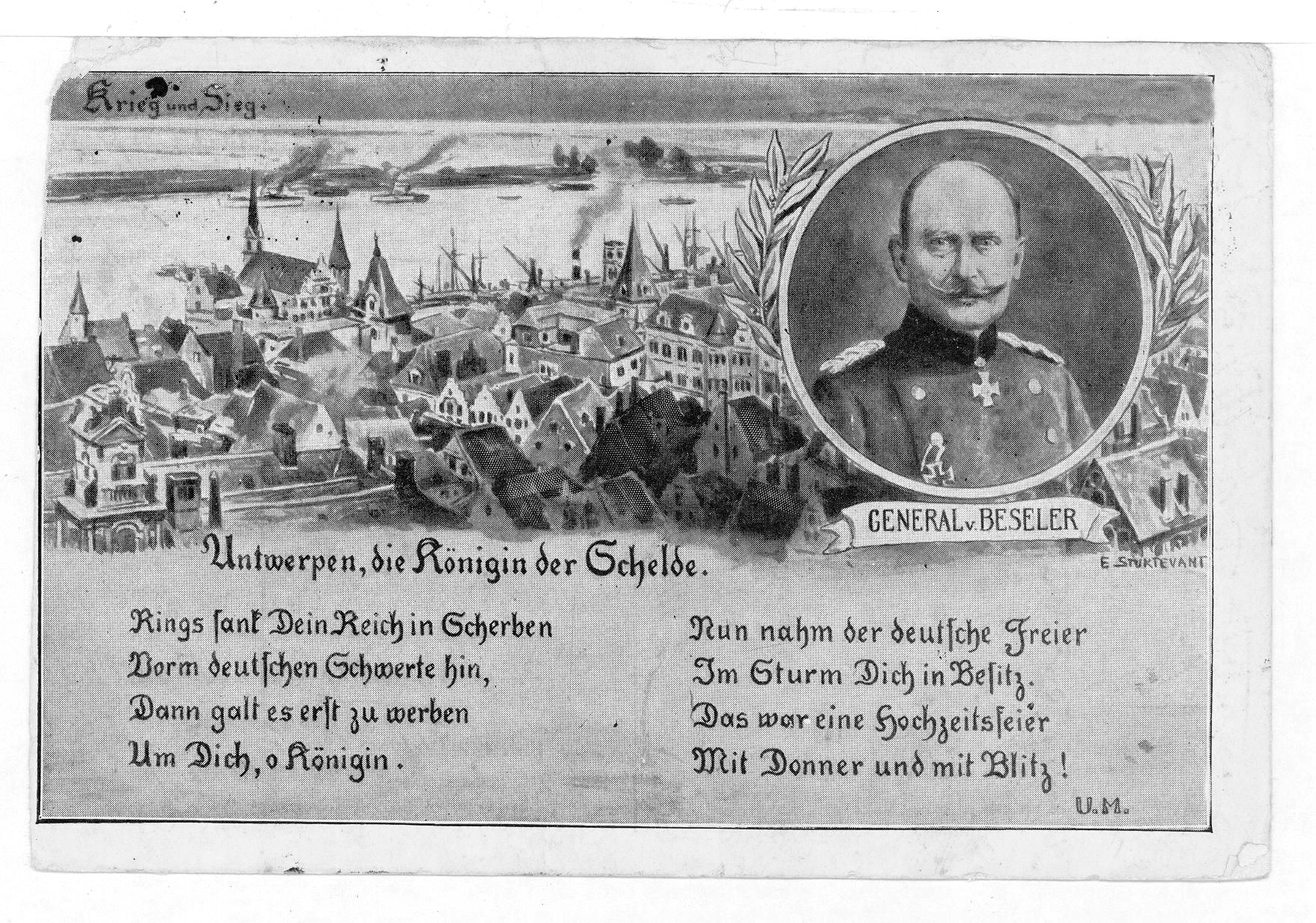
Contemporary German postcard, celebrating General von Besseler's capture of the "Queen of the Scheldt".

In the History of the Great War (1915–1948), the official British account of World War I, James Edmonds wrote that although the operations to save Antwerp had failed, the resistance of the defenders (after the outer forts were destroyed) detained German troops, when they were needed for operations against Ypres and the coast. Ostend and Zeebrugge were captured unopposed, while further west Nieuwpoort (Nieuport) and Dunkirk were held by the Allies, which thwarted the final German attempt to turn the Allied northern flank. The troops from Antwerp were also needed to cover the approach of four German corps towards Ypres, which caused delays to all the German manoeuvres in the north.

Edmonds wrote that it had been a mistake to assume that second line troops were sufficient to hold fortifications and that the effect on recruits and over-aged reservists of being subjected to heavy artillery-fire, which destroyed "impregnable" defences as the field forces retreated to safety, had a deleterious effect on morale, which could only be resisted by first-class troops. A large amount of ammunition and many of the 2,500 guns at Antwerp were captured intact by the Germans. The c. 80,000 surviving men of the Belgian field army escaped westwards, with most of the Royal Naval Division. The British lost 57 killed, 138 wounded, 1,479 interned and 936 taken prisoner.

=== Subsequent operations ===
Bomb damage in Antwerp

The Belgian forces which had escaped from Antwerp had been in action for two months and the King planned to withdraw west of a line from St Omer–Calais to rest the army, incorporate recruits and train replacements but was persuaded to assemble the army on a line from Dixmude, north to the port of Nieuport and Furnes 5 mi (8.0 km) to the south-west of the port to maintain occupation of Belgian territory. The Belgian Army continued its retirement on 11 and 12 October, covered by the original Cavalry Division and a second one formed from divisional cavalry, along with cyclists and motor machine-gun sections. On 14 October the Belgian army began to dig in along the Yser, the 6th and 5th Divisions to the north of French territorial divisions from Boesinghe, along the Yser canal to Dixmude, where the Fusiliers Marins had formed a bridgehead, covered by the artillery of the Belgian 3rd Division, with the rest of the division in reserve at Lampernisse to the west. The 4th, 1st and 2nd Divisions prolonged the line north with advanced posts at Beerst, Keyem, Schoore and Mannekensvere, about 1 mi (1.6 km) forward on the east bank. A bridgehead was also held near the coast around Lombartzyde and Westende to cover Nieuport, with the 2nd Cavalry Division in reserve. On 18 October the German III Reserve Corps from Antwerp, began operations against Belgian outposts on the east bank from Dixmude to the sea, in the Battle of the Yser (16–31 October).

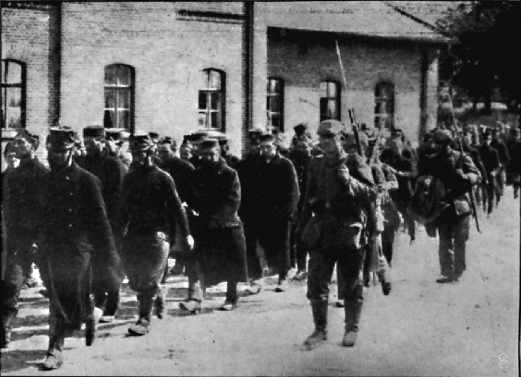
Belgian prisoners of war being marched away.

The Allied forces around Ghent withdrew on the approach of German forces on 11 October. The British 7th Division moved to Aeltre 10 mi (16 km) to the west, made rendezvous with British detachments, which had moved inland from Bruges and began to march to Ypres. The southern flank was covered by the 3rd Cavalry Division, which had moved from Thourout to Roulers and the French Fusiliers Marins brigade moved on to Dixmude. At Thielt on the night of 12/13 October, General Capper, the 7th Division commander was informed that German cavalry near Hazebrouck had retired on the approach of the British II Corps, leaving the country west of the 7th Division clear of German forces. The division reached Roulers on 13/14 October, met BEF cavalry near Kemmel and linked with the French 87th Territorial Division around Ypres. The German IV Cavalry Corps had moved south four days previously, except for several Uhlan who were disturbed by a party arranging billets and captured by the 10th Hussars.

By 18 October the Belgian, British and French troops in northern France and Belgium had formed a line with the BEF II Corps in position with the 5th Division from La Bassée Canal north to Beau Puits, the 3rd Division from Illies to Aubers and three divisions of the French Cavalry Corps of General Conneau in position from Fromelles to Le Maisnil, the BEF III Corps with the 6th Division from Radinghem to Epinette and the 4th Division from Epinette to Pont Rouge, the BEF Cavalry Corps with the 1st and 2nd Cavalry divisions, from Deulemont to Tenbrielen, the BEF IV Corps with the 7th Division and 3rd Cavalry Division from Zandvoorde to Oostnieuwkirke, the French Groupe Bidon and the de Mitry Cavalry Corps from Roulers to Cortemarck, the French 87th and 89th Territorial Divisions from Passchendaele to Boesinghe and then the Belgian Field Army and fortress troops from Boesinghe to Nieuport (including the Fusilier Marin brigade at Dixmude). The Battle of the Yser began on 16 October.

== See also ==
- Constant Permeke – Belgian artist who served in the Belgian army and was wounded during the siege of Antwerp
