= German Jewish military personnel of World War I =

Overview of Jewish soldiers of the German Empire

An estimated 100,000 German Jewish military personnel served in the German Army during World War I, of whom 12,000 were killed in action. The Iron Cross was awarded to 18,000 German Jews during the war.

While strong attempts were made during the Nazi era to suppress the Jewish contribution and even to blame them for Germany's defeat, using the stab-in-the-back myth, the German Jews who served in the German Army have found recognition and renewed interest in German publications.

== Overview ==
=== Pre-World War I ===
German Jews serving in the military predates the formation of the second German Empire in 1871, Jews having served in the Prussian Army in the German Campaign of 1813, the "Wars of Liberation". Meno Burg became the highest ranking German Jew in the Prussian Army in the 19th century, reaching the rank of Major. Jews continued to serve in the Prussian Army during the Second Schleswig War (1864), the Austro-Prussian War (1866), and the Franco-Prussian War (1870–71). After the establishment of the Empire in 1871, Jews in the Prussian Army did not receive the anticipated equal rights; they were barred from government positions and officer ranks, while other German states like Hamburg and the Kingdom of Bavaria were more liberal. Between 1880 and 1910, up to 30,000 German Jews served in the Prussian Army, but none were promoted to the rank of officer. However, among the 1,500 Jews who converted to Christianity, 300 were promoted.

=== World War I ===
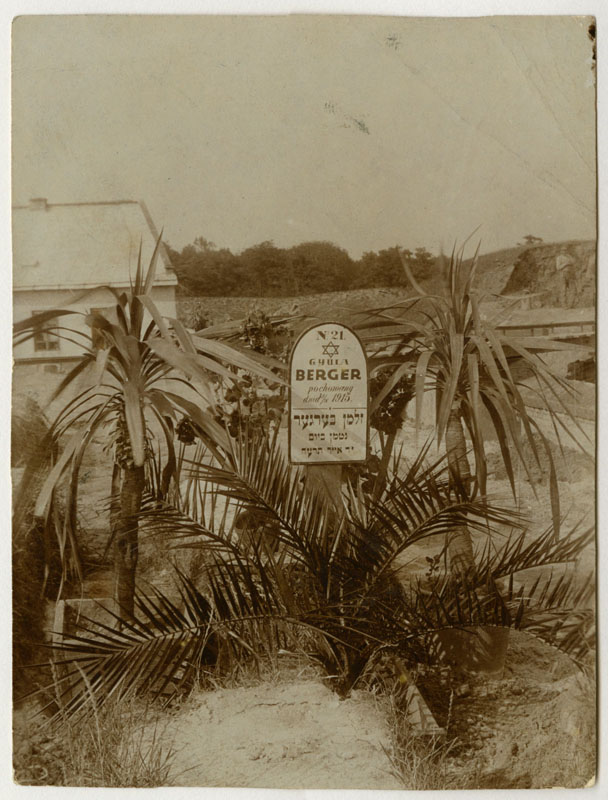
Tombstone of Zalmen Berger (d. 1915), a Jewish soldier who fell while serving in the German army during World War I, Jarosław, Poland.

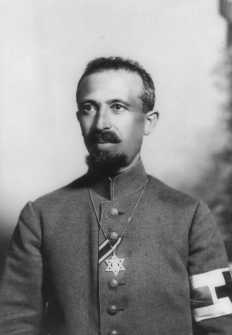
Feldrabbiner Aaron Tänzer during World War I, with the ribbon of the Iron Cross and a Star of David, 1917

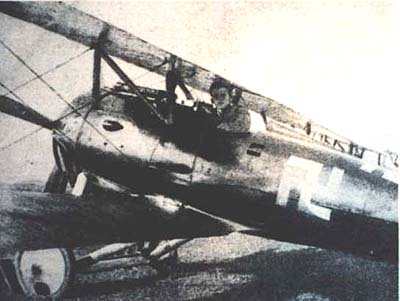
Fritz Beckhardt in his Siemens-Schuckert D.III fighter of Jasta 26; the reversed swastika insignia was a good luck symbol.

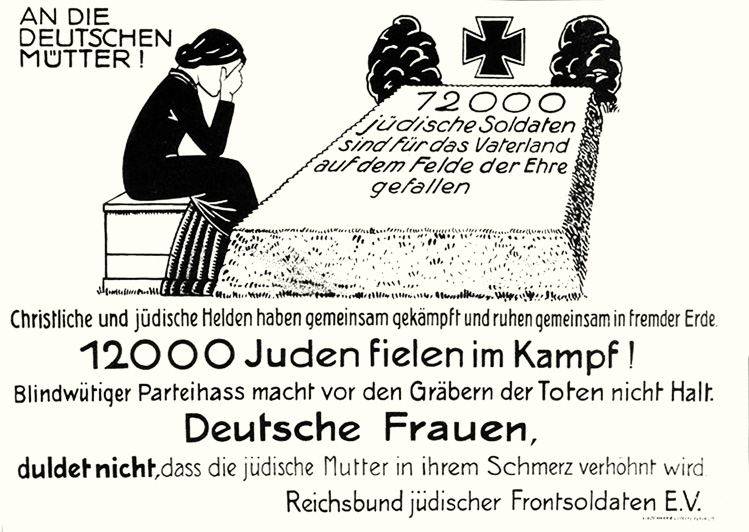
Poster in memory of 12,000 German Jewish Soldiers who died in World War I (1920)

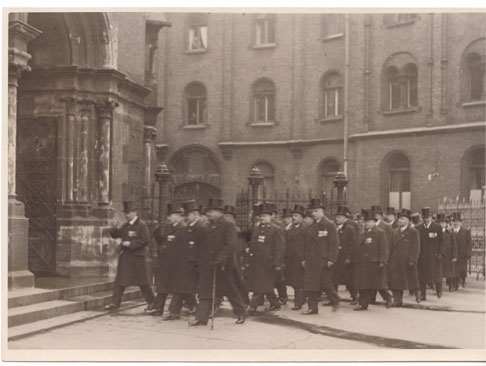
Jewish war veterans entering synagogue for service to honor the war dead; Munich 1935

Some Jews did fear marginalisation as the German public enthusiastically geared up for the Great War, but once the war began such attitudes dissipated and the general reaction of Germany's Jews was to greet the war with enthusiasm. With the outbreak of World War I in 1914, the situation drastically changed for German Jews in the military. At the start of the war, 12,000 German Jews volunteered for the German Army. Of the 100,000 Jews who served with the German military, 70,000 fought at the front line, 12,000 were killed in action, and 3,000 were promoted to officer ranks, but they could only become officers of the reserve, not the regular army. The Iron Cross was awarded to 18,000 German Jews during the war, of which 1,000 received the first class award. Jewish-born Wilhelm Frankl became the first member of the flying corps to be awarded the Pour le Mérite. The anti-semitic Judenzählung of 1916 disgusted many German Jewish soldiers, being aimed at falsely proving that Jews were trying to avoid military service. For many German Jews, the war held the hope of being treated equal to non-Jewish Germans for the first time. Many Jews also held strong patriotic feelings for Germany and the belief that the war in the East against the Russian Empire would bring the liberation of their fellow Eastern European Jews from pogroms and persecution.

Immediately with the outbreak of the war, the Federation of German Jews requested the introduction of Feldrabbiner (English: Field Rabbis), rabbis dedicated to military chaplaincy in the German Army, something that had not existed before in the German Empire. In August 1914, eighty-one German rabbis volunteered to serve as Field Rabbis, and the first seven, among them Leo Baeck, entered service the following month. On the Eastern Front, with the approval of the German High Command, the rabbis also served the local Jewish population, not just the German Jewish soldiers.

=== Weimar Republic and Nazi Germany ===
The Reichsbund jüdischer Frontsoldaten was formed in 1919 with the aim of helping veterans as well as promoting the sacrifice of the German Jewish community during the conflict. After the rise of the Nazis to power in 1933, Jewish veterans were initially protected against dismissal from government jobs after an intervention on their behalf by German President Paul von Hindenburg, but this changed in 1935 after his death. After the events of the Kristallnacht in 1938, the federation stopped its activities and advised its members, almost 40,000, to emigrate from Germany. The veterans who remained in Germany, also initially released after arrests during the Kristallnacht, received no special treatment after this, being deported to concentration camps and murdered like other Jewish German citizens. The Nazis attempted to eradicate all evidence of Jewish soldiers fighting for Germany in World War I.

=== After World War II ===
In 1968 the Jewish authorities in Germany decided to mark the 3,000 known Jewish war graves of the Western Front of World War I with special markers bearing the Star of David and a Hebrew inscription. The names of the 12,000 Jewish war dead had been published under the direction of Leo Löwenstein in a book published in 1932, titled Die Jüdischen Gefallenen. A book consisting of letters sent home by Jewish soldiers during the war was published by the West German Bundeswehr in 1961.

In 2006, on the eve of the 68th anniversary of the Kristallnacht, soldiers of the Bundeswehr formed the Bund jüdischer Soldaten, a federation of Jewish soldiers in the German Army, similar to the former Reichsbund jüdischer Frontsoldaten. While few German Jews joined the West German Army after the Second World War, descendants of people who suffered through the Nazi persecution having been exempt from national service, by 2014 the Bundeswehr had around 250 German Jewish soldiers in its ranks again.

== List of German Jewish military personnel ==
Notable German Jewish military personnel of World War I, sorted by surname in alphabetical order:

| Name | Born | Died | Notes |
| Leo Baeck | 1873 | 1956 | Feldrabbiner in the German Army, president of the Reichsvertretung der Deutschen Juden, survivor of the Theresienstadt concentration camp |
| Fritz Beckhardt | 1889 | 1962 | Vizefeldwebel, fighter ace in World War I, awarded the House Order of Hohenzollern |
| Rudolf Callmann | 1892 | 1976 | German lawyer and World War I veteran |
| Emanuel Carlebach | 1874 | 1927 | Feldrabbiner in the German Army |
| Ludwig Frank | 1874 | 1914 | Member of the German Reichstag, killed in action |
| Otto Frank | 1889 | 1980 | Leutnant, father of Anne Frank |
| Wilhelm Frankl | 1893 | 1917 | Leutnant, First member of the flying corps to be awarded the Pour le Mérite, killed in action |
| Hirsch Gradenwitz | 1876 | 1943 | Feldrabbiner in the German Army, murdered at Auschwitz concentration camp |
| Berthold Guthmann | 1893 | 1944 | Served in Imperial German Air Service in World War I; murdered in Auschwitz concentration camp |
| Hugo Gutmann | 1880 | 1962 | Leutnant, Adolf Hitler's superior officer in 1918 who nominated the latter for the Iron Cross |
| Bruno Italiener | 1881 | 1956 | Feldrabbiner in the German Army |
| Siegfried Klein | 1882 | 1944 | Feldrabbiner in the German Army, murdered at Auschwitz concentration camp |
| Victor Klemperer | 1881 | 1960 | Romance Languages scholar, his diary of his life in Nazi Germany is an important historic source, author of LTI – Lingua Tertii Imperii |
| de:Richard Lachmann | 1885 | 1916 | Awarded the Iron Cross at Fort Souville, was later killed in action with the 3. Jäger-Regimentsnear at Carny Czeremos in the Carpathian Mountains. Founding member of the de:Paläontologische Gesellschaft (Paleontological Society of Germany) |
| Kurt Landauer | 1884 | 1961 | German World War I veteran and president of FC Bayern Munich on four occasions between 1913 and 1951 |
| Paul Lazarus | 1888 | 1951 | Feldrabbiner in the German Army |
| Ernst Levy | 1881 | 1968 | German World War I veteran of 1. Garde-Feldartillerie-Regiment and Professor of Roman Law. |
| Leo Löwenstein | 1879 | 1956 | Hauptmann, founder of the Reichsbund jüdischer Frontsoldaten, survivor of the Theresienstadt concentration camp |
| David Mannheimer | 1863 | 1919 | Feldrabbiner in the German Army |
| Julius Marx | | | Leutnant, had his war diaries published in 1964 |
| Leopold Rosenak | 1868 | 1923 | Feldrabbiner in the German Army, opened a Jewish school in occupied Kowno during the war |
| Willi Rosenstein | 1892 | 1949 | Leutnant, Fighter pilot in World War I |
| Friedrich Rüdenberg | 1892 | 1977 | Fighter pilot in World War I |
| Martin Salomonski | 1881 | 1944 | Feldrabbiner in the German Army, murdered at Auschwitz concentration camp |
| Hugo Schiff | 1892 | 1986 | Feldrabbiner in the German Army |
| Karl Schwarzschild | 1873 | 1916 | German physicist, astronomer, and World War I veteran |
| Jacob Sonderling | 1878 | 1964 | Feldrabbiner in the German Army |
| Aaron Tänzer | 1871 | 1937 | Chaplain, Feldrabbiner in the German Army, volunteered and served at the Eastern Front for three years |
| Helmuth Wilberg | 1880 | 1941 | Served in Imperial German Air Service and was a World War II Luftwaffe general (According to Jewish religious Law considered to be Jewish as his mother was Jewish) |
| David Alexander Winter | 1878 | 1953 | Feldrabbiner in the German Army |
| Josef Zippes | | | Youngest volunteer of the German Army |

== In fiction ==
Avi Primor, formerly the ambassador of Israel to Germany, published a novel based on letters from Jewish soldiers titled Süß und ehrenvoll (English: Sweet and honourable), describing the experiences of two Jewish soldiers in World War I, one fighting for Germany, the other for France.

== See also ==
- German Jewish military personnel of World War II
