= German attack on Vimy Ridge order of battle =

The German Attack on Vimy Ridge, 21 May 1916 (Unternehmen Schleswig-Holstein)
- Part of Local operations December 1915 – June 1916 Western Front of the First World War
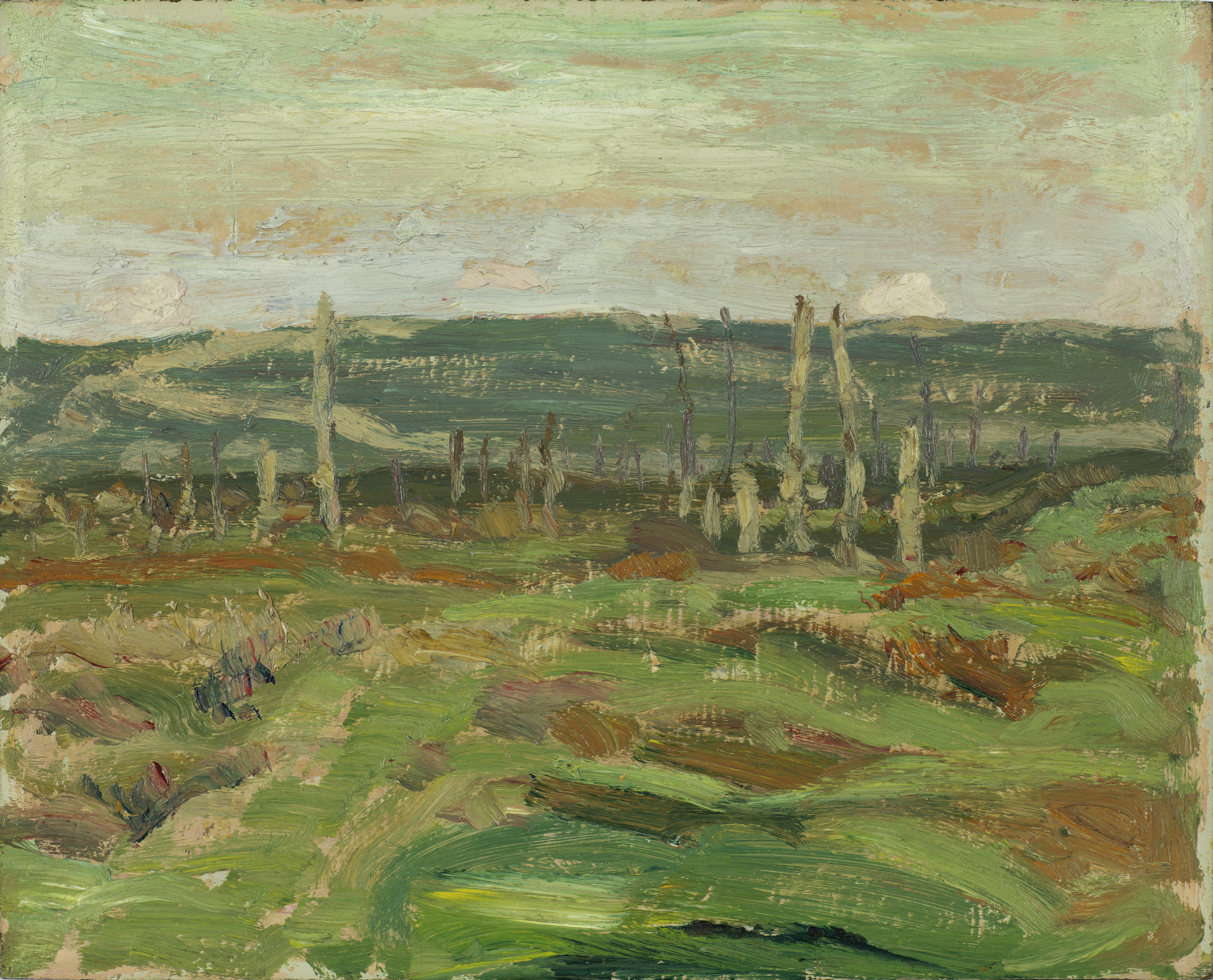
- A.Y. Jackson: Vimy Ridge from Souchez Valley
Date	21–22 May 1916
Location	Vimy Ridge, Nord-Pas-de-Calais, France 50°22′24″N 02°48′41″E
Result	German victory

Belligerents
Germany	British Empire

Commanders and leaders
(German Empire) Erich von Falkenhayn	(United Kingdom of Great Britain and Ireland) Douglas Haig

Strength
4 regiments (elts)	4 brigades (elts)

Casualties and losses
22–25 May: 1,344	22–24 May: 2,475
- Vimy Ridge, a commune in the Pas-de-Calais department. The ridge runs south-east from Givenchy-en-Gohelle to Farbus

The German attack on Vimy Ridge (Unternehmen Schleswig-Holstein/Operation Schleswig-Holstein) was a local German attack on Vimy Ridge. The attack took place on 21 May 1916 on the Western Front during the First World War. At the Third Battle of Artois (25 September – 4 November 1915) the French Tenth Army captured positions on the western slope of Vimy Ridge and the German 6th Army was forced back to positions on the steeper eastern slope. Both sides resorted to a continuous underground offensive. The Tenth Army was transferred south in March 1916, during the Battle of Verdun (21 February – 18 December 1916) and the British First Army and Third Army on either flank extended their inner flanks to take over Vimy Ridge.

Unternehmen Schleswig-Holstein was intended to capture British positions, from which the French mining offensive had been continued, to gain more defensive depth and to forestall mine attacks on the German positions. The British divisions were still organising their defences on the ridge, having recently relieved the French when the German attack began. The attack was a success and raised concerns that it was a prelude to a more ambitious attempt to capture Arras. Plans were made for a British counter-attack but it was cancelled, to avoid a diversion of effort from the forthcoming offensive on the Somme, in favour of the Attack on the Gommecourt Salient; plans laid in the meantime formed the basis for the attack of the Canadian Corps in April 1917.

== Orders of battle ==
=== German ===
The attack front was divided into three sectors, South with Foot Guard Regiment 5 (4th Guard Division), Centre with Reserve Infantry Regiment 86 of the 18th Reserve Division and North with Infantry Regiment 163 from the 17th Reserve Division, all three sector regiments being reinforced by machine-gun and engineer units; two more infantry regiments were held in reserve. Eighty artillery batteries, including the artillery of the IX Reserve Corps, IV Corps and the Guard Reserve Corps, plus six batteries of heavy howitzers and nine mortar batteries, along with six heavy, nine medium and eight light Minenwerfer were to participate. Sufficient ammunition was provided for batteries to fire at a rate of 200 shells per hour and counter-battery reconnaissance aircrews managed to locate 83 British artillery emplacements.

Northern Sector (Data taken from Rogers The German Attack at Vimy Ridge [2010] unless indicated.

Commander: Lieutenant-Colonel Sick

- 17th Reserve Division
- Infantry Regiment 163
  - 5th Company and 8th Company
  - Pioneer Company 268
  - Machine-Gun Section 71 (7 guns)
  - Machine-Gun Company 163 (7 guns)
  - 1 company, Infantry Regiment 163 (local reserve)
  - 6th and 7th Company, Infantry Regiment 163 and 2 machine-guns in regimental reserve (Givenchy-en-Gohelle)
- Brigade reserve
  - 9th and 10th Company, Infantry Regiment 163 (La Coulotte)
  - 11th and 12th Company, Infantry Regiment 163 (Sallaumines)

Central Sector 18th Reserve Division

Commander: Colonel von Wurmb

- Reserve Infantry Regiment 86

Right flank

  - 1st Company, 3rd Company and 2nd Company, followed by 6th Company, 5th Company and 4th Company as carriers
  - Half of 1st Company, Reserve Pioneer Battalion 9
  - 1st Company, Bavarian Pioneer Battalion 12

Left flank

  - 4th Company, 1st Company, Reserve Jäger Battalion 9
  - 13th Company and 15th Company, Reserve Infantry Regiment 86
  - 10th Company, Bavarian Reserve Pioneer Battalion
  - Mining Company 293
  - 2nd Company, Reserve Jäger Battalion 9
  - 3rd Company, Reserve Jäger Battalion 9 and machine-gun reserve
  - 14th Company, Reserve Infantry Regiment 86 (brigade reserve)

(The column was arrayed to a depth of about 1,006 m (1,100 yd) and a cavalry machine-gun section with captured Russian guns had been added to Reserve Jäger Battalion 9.)

Southern Sector

- 4th Guard Division
- Foot Guard Regiment 5
  - 5th Company, 8th Company

=== British ===
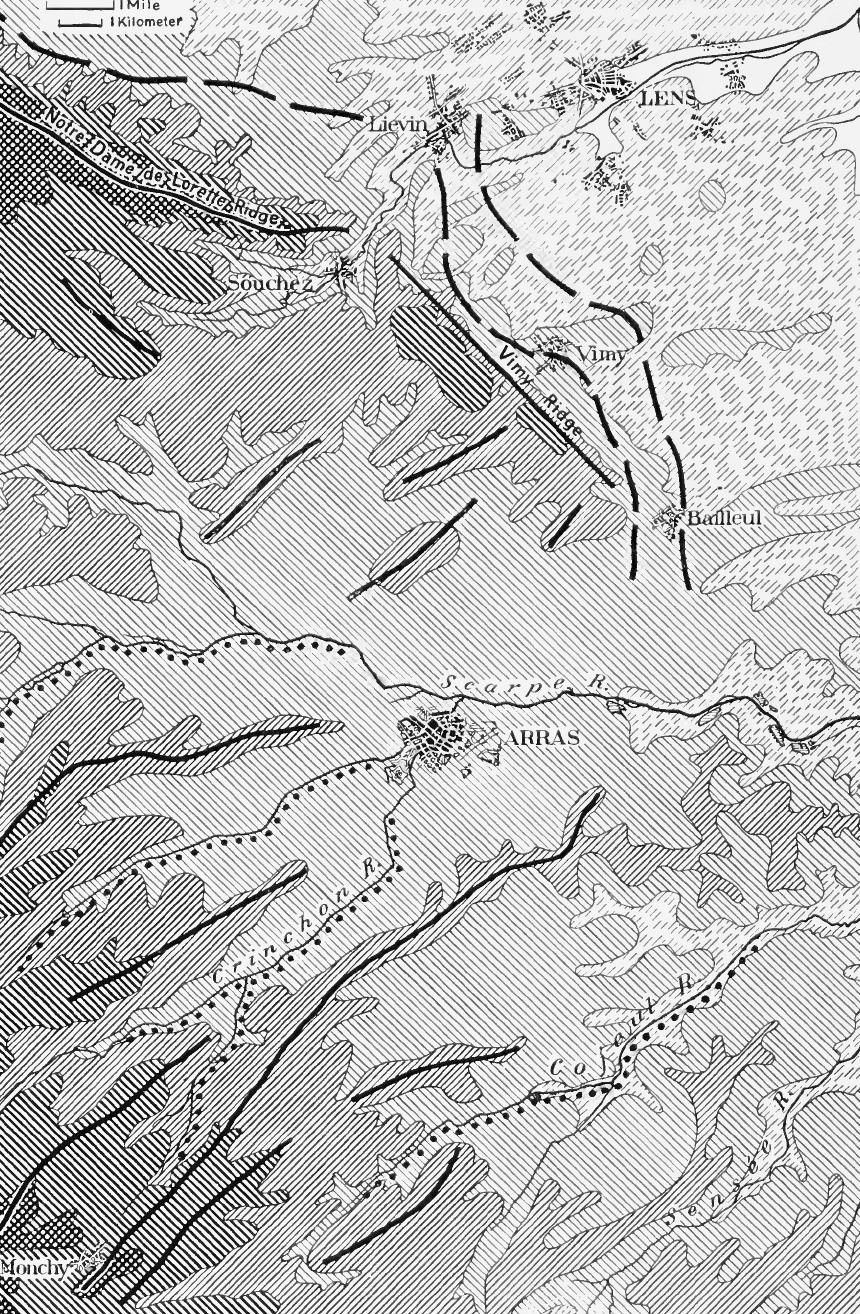
Topography of the Arras–Lens area showing ridges

In early 1916, the Berthonval and Carency sectors were transferred to the First Army, IV Corps (Lieutenant-General Henry Wilson) from the Third Army, XVII Corps (Lieutenant-General Sir Julian Byng) and from the 25th Division to the 47th (1/2nd London) Division, which extended its right flank .75 mi (1.21 km) southwards to P sector. Neither side controlled the crest and to the south of the Berthonval sector, the British intended to treat the front line as the main line of resistance to protect Zouave Valley, which rose southwards from the valley of the Souchez river, about 800 yd (730 m) back from the front line. German gunners continually bombarded the Talus de Zouaves (Zouave embankment) in Zouave Valley, which could cut off British contact with the front line.

When the 47th (1/2nd London) Division moved its right flank to the south, Central Ave became the army boundary instead of Ersatz Ave; during a reshuffle on the night of 19/20 May, the northern defences were taken over by the 23rd Division. The 140th Brigade took over Berthonval from the 74th Brigade, 25th Division and the 141st Brigade took over Carency from the 142nd Brigade, which went into divisional reserve. The 7th Brigade, 25th Division in P sector came temporarily under the command of the 47th Division.

25th Division Data from Rogers The German Attack at Vimy Ridge [2010] unless indicated.

- 7th Brigade
  - 10th Battalion Cheshire Regiment

Berthonval sector

- 47th (1/2nd London) Division
- 140th Brigade
  - 1/7th Battalion, London Regiment (City of London)

Central Avenue – Ersatz Alley sectors

- 140th Brigade
  - 1/8th Battalion, London Regiment (Post Office Rifles)

Carency sector

- 141st Brigade
  - 1/20th London Regiment (Blackheath and Woolwich)

Reinforcements

- 47th (1/2nd London) Division
  - 1/3rd, 1/4th and 2/3rd London Field Company Royal Engineers
  - 1/15th London, 1/18th London
- 2nd Division
- 99th Brigade
  - 17th Battalion, Royal Fusiliers (Empire)
  - 22nd Battalion, Royal Fusiliers (Kensington)
  - 23rd Battalion, Royal Fusiliers (1st Sportsmen's)
  - 1st Battalion, King's Royal Rifle Corps
