= Army of the North (disambiguation) =

The Army of the North or was one of the armies deployed by the United Provinces of the Río de la Plata in the Spanish American wars of independence.

Army of the North, Northern Army, or similar names may also refer to:

== Current components of larger armies ==
- Northern Army (Japan)
- United States Army North
- Shan State Army - North, Shan nationalist insurgent group in Myanmar (Burma)

== Historical armies ==
- Army of the North (Ireland), a force of Irish Protestants raised in 1689 during the Williamite War
- Army of the North (United States), American field army during the War of 1812
- Northern Army (Russia), a White force 1918-1920

== Historical components of larger armies ==
- Army of the North (France), any of several historical units of the French Army
- Army of the North (Spain), the Nationalist army that rose up and fought against the Second Spanish Republic during the Spanish Civil War.
- Armed Forces of the North (1976–1983), rebel army during the Chadian Civil War
- Northern District Army (Japan) (1940–1945), of the Imperial Japanese Army
- North Army (German Empire) (1914), during World War I
- Army Group North (1939–1945), German formation during World War II
- Northern Army Group (1952–1993), a NATO military formation during the Cold War
- Northern Group of Forces (1945-1993), Soviet formation during the Cold War.
- Northern Army (1895–1905), part of the British Indian Army's Northern Command

== Northern armies in opposition to southern armies ==
- Union Army in the U.S. Civil War
- North Vietnam Army
- North Korea Army

== See also ==
- Northern Command (disambiguation)
- División del Norte, faction in the Mexican Revolution
- Division of the North, Spanish force in the Napoleonic Wars
- War in the North, Spanish Civil war
- Sudan People's Liberation Movement-North, insurgent group in Sudan
