= Fritz Beckhardt =

German flying ace (1889–1962)

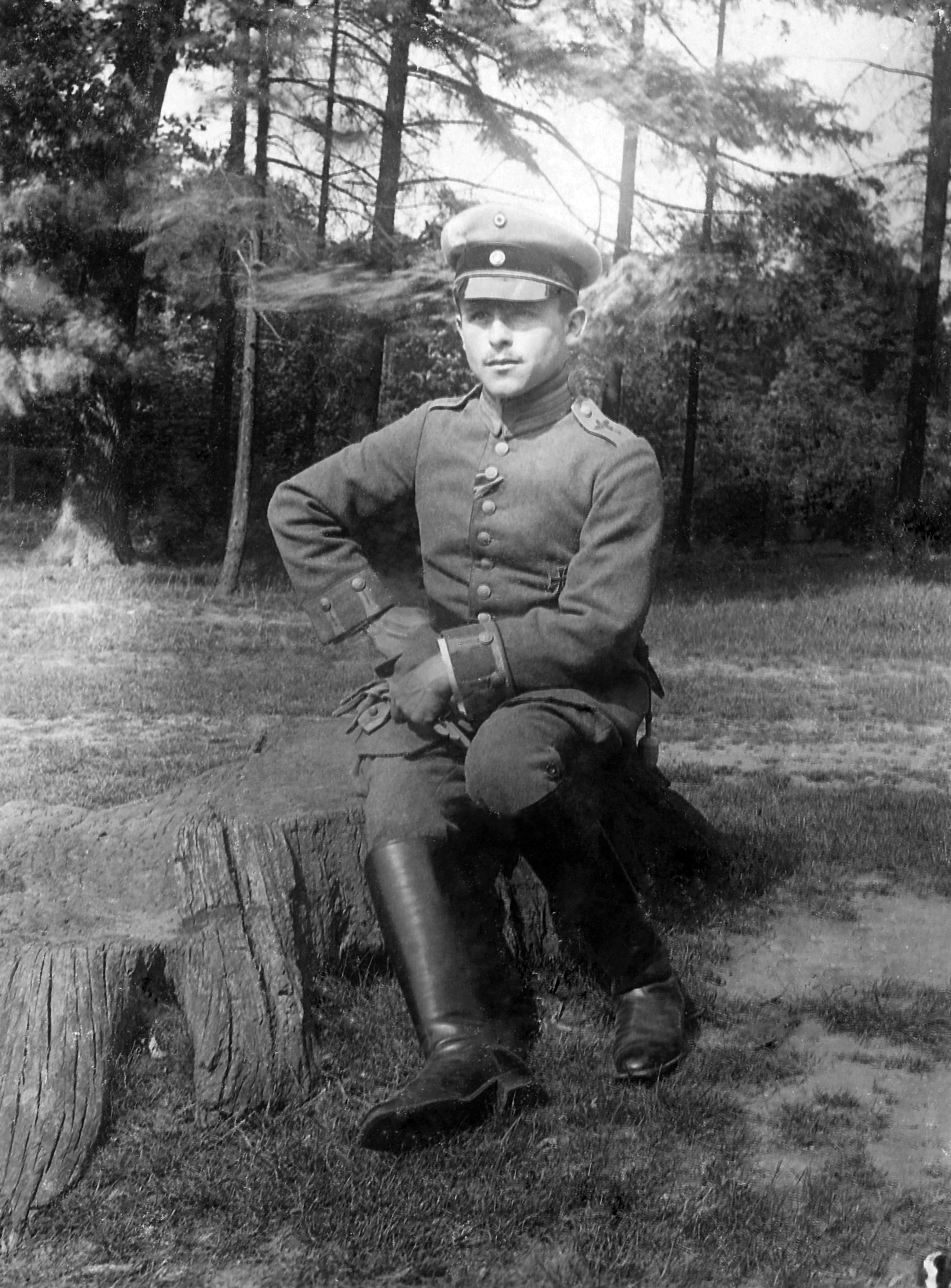
- Fritz Beckhardt as a fighter pilot in 1918
- Born: 27 March 1889; Wallertheim, Rheinhessen, Germany
- Died: 13 January 1962 (aged 72); Wiesbaden, West Germany
- Military career
- Allegiance: German Empire
- Branch: Infantry, Air Service
- Service years: 1907–1909, 1914–1919
- Rank: Vizefeldwebel
- Awards: Iron Cross, Royal House Order of Hohenzollern

Vizefeldwebel Fritz Beckhardt (27 March 1889 – 13 January 1962) was a German Jewish fighter ace in World War I. The Nazis later expunged him from Luftwaffe history because his valorous war record of 17 aerial victories belied their assertions that Jews were inherently cowardly.

== Early life ==
Fritz Beckhardt was born in Wallertheim, Rheinhessen, Germany. His father was Abraham Beckhardt.

Prior to World War I, he had worked in a grocery store, then in a menswear warehouse in Hamburg. As part of his apprenticeship in textiles, he worked in Bingen, Hadamar, and Hamburg. During this prewar period, he served in Infanterie-Regiment No. 143 from 1907 to 1909.

By 1914, he was working in an uncle's clothing factory in Marseille, France. He repatriated himself to Germany to once again serve in the infantry, until 1916.

On 3 August 1914, Beckhardt volunteered to serve in Company 12 of Infanterie-Regiment Graf Bose (1. Thüringisches) Nr. 31. On 30 November, he transferred to Reserve-Infanterie-Regiment Nr. 86. During his service with this regiment, he earned both a First and Second Class Iron Cross.

== Aerial Service ==
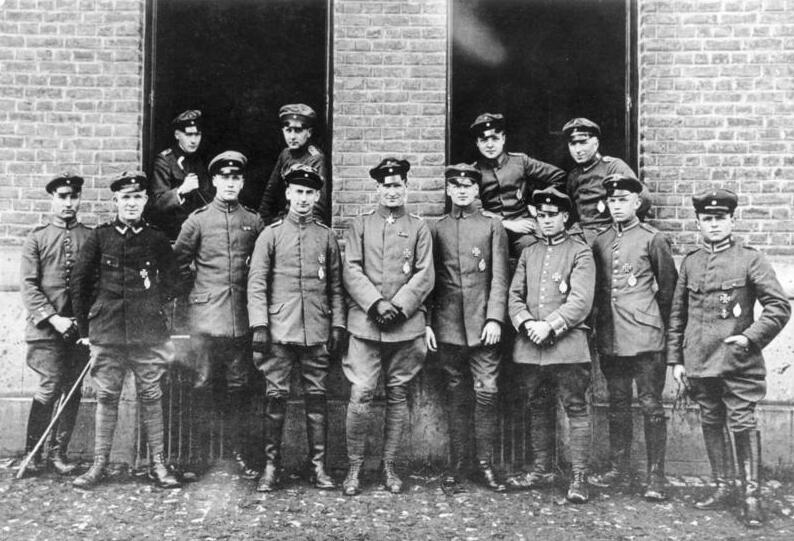
Fritz Beckhardt at far right of picture, with Bruno Loerzer (center of picture), his brother Fritz Loerzer, and other members of Jasta 26. May 1918.

He then trained as a pilot at FEA 5 at Hannover in January, 1917. His first operational assignment, from 29 August to 14 November 1917, was with FA 3, which flew exceptionally long reconnaissance missions. He transferred to Schusta 11. He attended Jastaschule 1 to upgrade to fighter pilot status. He then went on to Jagdstaffel 26, where he served from 17 February 1918 through to 20 May 1918; Hermann Göring also served in Jasta 26. Beckhardt and Göring were stationed at the same airfields for eight months and knew each other well.

On 23 March 1918, Beckhardt submitted his first combat claim, for a victory over a Royal Aircraft Factory S.E.5a, but it went unconfirmed. On 11 April, he scored his first victory, over a Royal Aircraft Factory R.E.8.

Rather ironically, Vizfeldwebel Beckhardt's personal insignia, which was featured on at least three of his airplanes, was a Swastika; however, the swastika at that time was not yet a Nazi symbol, and Beckhardt's swastika turned in the opposite direction to the Nazi one.

When the armistice ended the fighting on 11 November 1918, he refused to surrender his fighter plane. Instead, two days later, he flew his Siemens-Schuckert D.III into Switzerland and was interned until 1919.

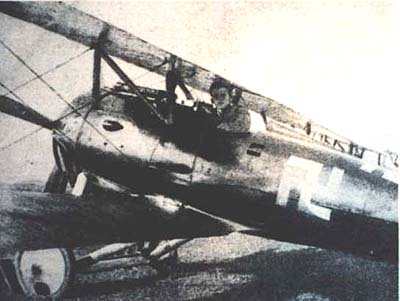
Fritz Beckhardt in his Siemens-Schuckert D.III fighter.

By the war's end, Beckhardt was a member of the League of Jewish Soldiers at the Front.

Beckhardt was one of two German Jews awarded the House Order of Hohenzollern; the other was Wilhelm Frankl (although Frankl converted to Christianity). The names of Frankl and Beckhardt were removed from the list of recipients during the Nazi era. He was twice personally congratulated by the German Emperor Wilhelm II for his successes as a fighter pilot.

== Between the wars ==
In 1926, Beckhardt married Rosa Emma Neumann in Wiesbaden, Germany. He then ran his father-in-law's grocery store until 1934. When the Nazis began their boycott of Jewish businesses on 1 April 1933, he moved from the suburb of Sonnenberg, where he had been doing business, to the center of Wiesbaden. There he had a business that specialized in edible oils and fats.

In 1936 he drove two Jewish brothers named Frohwein to the Belgian border so they could flee the Gestapo. The Frohweins later opened a kosher butchery in Golders Green, London.

In 1937 Beckhardt was accused of having sexual relations with a non-Jewish "Aryan" woman. As a result of the trial on 14 December 1937, he was convicted and sent to prison for a year and nine months. After his time in prison he was taken in protective custody to a penal company in Buchenwald concentration camp as prisoner no. 8135. Upon his release in March 1940, it was written in his records by the SS that he had scored 17 victories as a fighter pilot during World War I.

== World War II and beyond ==
Apparently, Hermann Göring had interceded on the grounds of sentiment towards his old comrade in arms to facilitate his release. Beckhardt's lawyer, Berthold Guthmann, had served with both Göring and Beckhardt during World War I. (Guthmann, who was Jewish, died in KZ camp Auschwitz on 29 September 1944).

Fritz and Rosa Emma Beckhardt escaped to neutral Lisbon, Portugal, thence to England. After a brief internment on the Isle of Man, the Beckhardts moved in with one of the Froweins. In London they reunited with their two children Kurt and Sue Hilde who had been brought to England by the "Kindertransport"-Organizations (Refugee Children's Movement (RCM)). The RCM had its seat in Bloomsbury house, London. It consisted of many Jewish and Christian organisations.

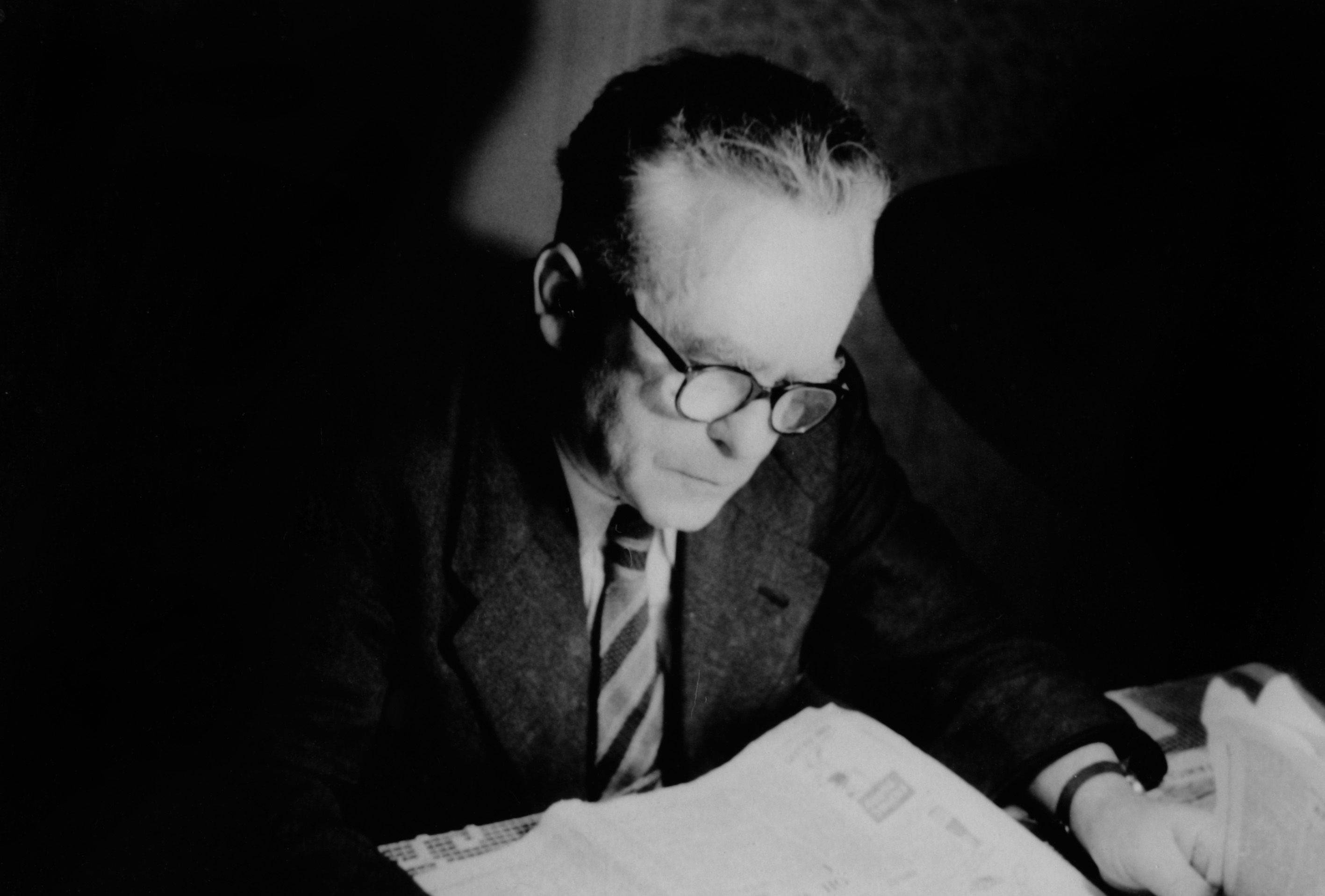
Beckhardt in his later years. This photo dates from the 1950s.

In 1950, Beckhardt returned to Wiesbaden and recovered his house and shop and a part of his other property through legal action. He and his son Kurt then opened the first self-serve grocery in Wiesbaden. Beckhardt ran the grocery until his death on 13 January 1962. His death was caused by several strokes. He and his wife are buried at the Jewish cemetery of Wiesbaden.

His son Kurt lived in a camp in Barham, near Ipswich, in different hostels in Sheffield and in Golders Green, London until he returned with his father to Germany. He is now living in Bonn, Germany. His daughter Suse Hilde became a British subject in January 1954 and lived in London.

Beckhardt's son Kurt did not reveal the family's Jewish background to his own son Lorenz to spare him from the kind of persecution they experienced during the Nazi era, raising him as a Catholic instead. Lorenz Beckhardt found out when he was 18 and researched the story of his grandfather, resulting in the publication of the book Der Jude mit dem Hakenkreuz. Meine deutsche Familie (English: The Jew with the Swastika. My German Family) about Fritz Beckhardt.

== Decorations and awards ==
- Member of the Royal House Order of Hohenzollern with Swords
- General Honour Decoration for Bravery (Grand Duchy of Hesse)
- Iron Cross (1914), 1st and 2nd class,
- Bravery Medal (Hesse) (Grand Duchy of Hesse)
- Military Merit Order, 3rd class (Bavaria)
- War Merit Cross (Baden)
- Black Wound Badge (1918)
- Field Honour Badge (Hamburg)
- Honour Cross of the World War 1914/1918
- Warrior Medal in Iron
- Prussian Military Pilot Badge
- Honour Goblet for the Victor in a dogfight
