= RJF =

RJF may refer to:

- Reichsbund jüdischer Frontsoldaten
- Reichsjugendführer Baldur von Schirach
- Raymond James Financial, Inc.
- Reines Jüdisches Fett
- Red Jacket Firearms LLC, manufacturer and seller of custom weapons located in Baton Rouge, Louisiana
- Robert James Fischer, American chess grandmaster and the eleventh World Chess Champion.
