= Rudolf Callmann =

German American legal scholar

- Born: 29 September 1892; Cologne, Rhenish Prussia, Germany
- Died: 12 March 1976 (aged 83); Kew Gardens, Queens, New York, United States
- Occupation: Legal scholar
- Spouse: Maria Hess (m. 1919)
- Children: Ellen Callmann

Rudolf Callmann (29 September 1892 – 12 March 1976) was a German American legal scholar. He was preeminent in the field of German and American competition law.

Born in Cologne into a wealthy Jewish family, Callmann earned a doctorate in law from the University of Freiburg in 1919. His studies had been interrupted by frontline service in World War I. In 1923, he entered his father's law firm in Cologne, and established himself as a leading authority on unfair competition and antitrust law. As a World War I veteran he was allowed to practice even after the Machtergreifung in 1933, but in 1936 decided to emigrate to the United States. He was offered a research fellowship at Harvard Law School, where he worked with Zechariah Chafee, while getting accustomed to American common law, and in 1939 he passed the bar exam. Between 1939 and 1945 he completed the American edition of his magnum opus on unfair competition, now (in revised edition) known as Callmann on Unfair Competition, Trademarks, and Monopolies.

In 1949, Callmann founded the boutique law firm Greene, Callmann & Durr in New York City, along with Orville N. Greene (1908–1997) and Frank L. Durr (1904–1990), where he practiced until 1971.

He died at his home in Kew Gardens, Queens at age 83.
