= Aaron Tänzer =

Austrian rabbi (1871–1937)

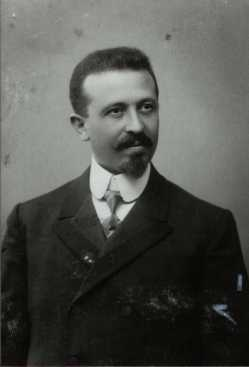
- Aaron Tänzer in 1907
- Born: 30 January 1871; Pressburg, Austria-Hungary
- Died: February 26, 1937 (aged 66); Göppingen, Württemberg, Germany
- Resting place: Jewish Cemetery in Goeppingen
- Education: University of Berlin
- Occupation: Rabbi
- Known for: Organized soup kitchens for local population in Poland during WW I.
- Military career
- Allegiance: German Empire
- Branch: Imperial German army
- Rank: Feldrabbiner
- Conflicts: World War 1
- Awards: June 4, 1916 Iron Cross, Second Class. August 29, 1916 Württemberg Order Of Friedrich First Class With Swords . November 5, 1916, Franz-Joseph-Order with War Decoration, Knight. May 25, 1918, Hamburg Hanseatic Cross. November 1, 1918, Wound Badge In Black.

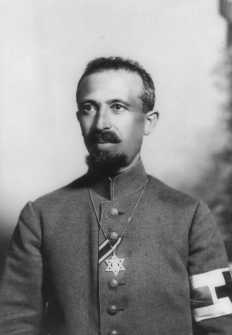
Aaron Tänzer during World War I, with the ribbon of the Iron Cross and a Star of David, 1917

Aaron Tänzer (German: Aron Tänzer, Hungarian: Tänzer Áron; also German: Arnold Tänzer; January 30, 1871 – February 26, 1937, Göppingen) was a rabbi in Austria and Germany, chaplain and author.

== Biography ==
He was born in Pressburg, Austria-Hungary (present day Bratislava, Slovakia).

He studied at the Pressburg Yeshiva, and studied Oriental philology and history at the University of Berlin (PhD 1895). In 1896, he was called to Hohenems, Austria as chief rabbi of Tyrol and Vorarlberg; and from 1904 to 1907 he was rabbi of Meran (Tyrol). From 1907 until his death, he served as rabbi of the Jewish community of Göppingen in Württemberg, Germany. His history of the Jews of Göppingen and nearby Jebenhausen is notable as a thorough documentation of a Jewish community from its beginnings.

In World War I, he served as a Feldrabbiner (Jewish chaplain) in the German army, primarily on the Eastern front. He looked after German and Austrian Jewish soldiers and took care of Jewish prisoners of war in POW camps like Doeberitz and Sedan.

Aron Tänzer's father was a rabbi and his mother worked as a seamstress for the Pressburg Jewish community. At the age of 21, Aron Tänzer enrolled at the University of Berlin. He studied philosophy, German and Semitic philology. Aron Tänzer received his doctorate in 1895 and in October 1896 he successfully applied for the vacant rabbinical position in Hohenems, Austria.

The Hohenems rabbinate also supervised nearby Jewish communities in Vorarlberg and, from 1878 to 1914, also formally the Jews living in Tyrol. Tänzer applied his extensive training in history to numerous scientific publications as well as the field of adult education. For example, he often gave lectures on literature and history for the Hohenems Education Club. In 1905 he published the history of the Jews in Hohenems, which is still considered the standard work today. His mindset and religious beliefs were shaped by liberal ideas and cultural openness.

From 1905 to 1907 Tänzer was a rabbi of the Jewish community of Meran and on September 1, 1907, became rabbi at the Göppingen synagogue. He held this position, in which he was responsible for the Jebenhausen district rabbinate, until his death in 1937. Right at the beginning of the First World War, Tänzer volunteered to work as a field rabbi. He served on the Eastern Front for three years. Tänzer looked after the soldiers, helped in the hospital and set up people's kitchens for the needy population. Tänzer was awarded several medals for his work in the field.

In Göppingen, Tänzer laid the foundation for a public library in 1909 which later evolved into the city library of Göppingen. In 1921 he became an honorary member of the Göppingen veterans and military association "Kampfgemeinschaft". The Rabbiner-Tänzer-Haus (Freihofstrasse 46), the former rabbinate building, in Göppingen was dedicated to the Taenzer family.

== Works ==
- Die Religionsphilosophie Josef Albo's (doctoral dissertation), Frankfort-on-the-Main, 1896
- Der Israelitische Friedhof in Hohenems (Jewish Cemetery Hohenems), Vienna, 1901
- Judenthum und Entwickelungslehre (Judaism and Evolution), Berlin, 1903
- Geschichte der Juden in Tirol und Vorarlberg (History of the Jews in Tirol and Vorarlberg), vol. i, ib. 1903–4.
- Die Geschichte der Juden in Hohenems und im übrigen Vorarlberg (History of the Jews in Hohenems and all of Vorarlberg) 1905
- Die Geschichte der Juden in Jebenhausen und Göppingen (The history of the Jews in Jebenhausen and Göppingen). Reprint of the 1927 edition. Konrad, Weißenhorn 1988, ISBN 3-87437-274-X (published by the Göppingen City Archives. Volume 23)
