= Reserve-Infanterie-Regiment Nr. 86 =

Military unit

Reserve-Infanterie-Regiment Nr. 86 was a reserve infantry regiment in the Imperial German Army organized during the mobilization period of August 1914, and remained in service through to the end of World War I.

== Organization ==
In accordance with the mobilization plan, the regiment began to organize in Flensburg (I. & II. Batls.) and Schleswig (III. Batl.) and was assigned to 35. Infanterie-Brigade, 18. Reserve-Division, IX. Reserve-Armee-Korps. Its organization was completed on August 9.

== First World War ==
Once the regiment was fully organized it was deployed south of Flensburg until August 22 to serve as a border guard against Denmark. Between August 22 and 24, the regiment was transported to Belgium, where it detrained in Esemael north of Brussels. The regiment's strength upon departure was: 83 officers, 3190 other ranks, and 240 horses.

== Commanders ==
- Oberstleutnant von Tippelskirch
- Oberst von Loeper
- Major von Scheffer (April 16, 1917 - c. March 19, 1918), later KIA as CO of Reserve-Infanterie-Regiment Nr. 213 [source states: Infanterie-Regiment Nr. 213]
- Major von Picardi (March 19, 1918 - ), formerly of 6. Garde-Grenadier-Regiment
- Major Claus ( - September 29, 1918), taken POW
- Major Deichmann (October 1, 1918 - )

== Notable members ==
- Fritz Beckhardt, flying ace, who won both the First and Second Class Iron Cross while with the regiment

== See also ==
- List of Imperial German infantry regiments
