= Berthold Guthmann =

German lawyer and soldier (1893–1944)

- Portrait of Guthmann
- Born: 13 April 1893; Eich, German Empire
- Died: 30 September 1944 (aged 51); Auschwitz-Birkenau, German-occupied Poland
- Spouse: Claire Guthmann
- Military career
- Allegiance: German Empire
- Branch: Luftstreitkräfte
- Rank: Leutnant
- Awards: Iron Cross Second Class, Tapferkeitsmedaille, Wound Badge
- Other work: Lawyer

Berthold Guthmann (13 April 1893 – 29 September 1944) was a German lawyer and First World War veteran. Guthmann, a German Jew, was the secular head of the Jewish community of Wiesbaden in its final years from 1938 to 1942 and was murdered at Auschwitz concentration camp in 1944.

== Biography ==
Berthold Guthmann, born in 1893 in Eich, studied law in Freiburg and Gießen before volunteering for military service in the Imperial German Army after the outbreak of the First World War, as did his two brothers. His brother Sally was killed in action at Verdun while his other brother, Eduard, survived the war and later emigrated to the United States. After joining the Luftstreitkräfte, the Imperial German Air Service, Guthmann became an observer and gunner and was awarded the Iron Cross Second Class for his bravery, serving in the Schutzstaffel 3 and attaining the rank of a Leutnant of the Landwehr.

After the war Guthmann became an attorney in Wiesbaden, Hesse, the city having had a sizeable Jewish community of 2,700 when the Nazis came to power in 1933. He was arrested and briefly sent to Buchenwald concentration camp after the Kristallnacht. Released from there, Guthmann and his son Paul were assaulted and badly injured in November 1939. Guthmann served as the secular leader of the Wiesbaden community from 1938 to 1942 and was also second in charge of the Frankfurt Jewish congregation in the last month prior to its forced dissolution. In 1940 Guthmann successfully appealed to Hermann Göring, himself a former World War I pilot, on behalf of fellow Jewish flying ace Fritz Beckhardt, allowing the latter to escape Nazi Germany.

Guthmann and his family were one of three Jewish families initially spared when the Jewish community of Wiesbaden was deported to Theresienstadt concentration camp in September 1942. In late 1942 the remaining Jews in Wiesbaden were arrested and moved to a camp at Frankfurt. Initially deported to Theresienstadt, Berthold Guthmann was killed at Auschwitz concentration camp on 30 September 1944, almost immediately after his arrival. His son Paul was killed at Mauthausen concentration camp in March 1945. His wife Klara and daughter Charlotte survived the Holocaust. Charlotte Guthmann (later Opfermann) emigrated to the United States, where she ultimately published two books about the Holocaust and her experiences in Germany and at Theresienstadt.
