= North Army (German Empire) =

Nordarmee North Army
- Flag of the Staff of an Armee Oberkommando (1871–1918)
- Active: August 1914
- Country: German Empire
- Type: Army

Insignia
- Abbreviation: A.O.K. Nord

The North Army (German: Nordarmee / Armeeoberkommando Nord / A.O.K. Nord) was an army level command of the German Army that existed briefly at the outbreak of World War I.

== History ==
The North Army was formed (on the outbreak of the war) in Schleswig to defend the German North Sea Coast in case of British landings. It was dissolved by the end of August 1914 as its major units had been transferred away.

== Structure ==
On formation, North Army consisted of

- IX Reserve Corps

with 25 infantry battalions, 5 machine gun companies (30 machine guns), 6 cavalry squadrons, 12 field artillery batteries (72 guns), 4 heavy batteries (16 guns), a Field Airship Detachment and 7 pioneer companies. It was transferred to the Western Front, joining 1st Army in late August.

- "Higher Landwehr Commander 1" (Höherer Landwehr-Kommandeur 1)

with 24 infantry battalions, 6 cavalry squadrons and 4 field artillery batteries (24 guns). Initially referred to as the Landwehr Division Goltz, after its commander; later renamed 1st Landwehr Division. By 27 August, it had joined the 8th Army on the Eastern Front and participated in the battles of Tannenberg and 2nd Masurian Lakes.

- Coastal Protection
  - IV Battalion, 75th Landwehr Infantry Regiment
  - IV Battalion, 76th Landwehr Infantry Regiment
  - V Battalion, 76th Landwehr Infantry Regiment
- North Sea Islands (5 infantry battalions, 9 heavy batteries (36 heavy howitzers), 2 pioneer companies)
  - Borkum
    - I and II Battalions, 79th Reserve Infantry Regiment
    - 2nd Abteilung, 2nd Foot Artillery Regiment
    - 1st Reserve Battery, 2nd Foot Artillery Regiment
    - 1st Landwehr Pioneer Company of X Corps District
  - Sylt
    - I and II Battalions, 85th Landwehr Infantry Regiment
    - a Battery of 1st Abteilung, 2nd Foot Artillery Regiment
    - 2nd Reserve Battery, 2nd Foot Artillery Regiment
    - 1st Landwehr Pioneer Company of IX Corps District
  - Pellworm
    - III Battalion, 85th Landwehr Infantry Regiment
    - a Battery of 1st Abteilung, 2nd Foot Artillery Regiment
    - 3rd Reserve Battery, 2nd Foot Artillery Regiment

== Glossary ==
- Armee-Abteilung, or Army Detachment, in the sense of "something detached from an Army". It is not under the command of an Army so is, in itself, a small Army.
- Armee-Gruppe, or Army Group, in the sense of a group within an Army and under its command; generally formed as a temporary measure for a specific task.
- Heeresgruppe, or Army Group, in the sense of a number of armies under a single commander.

== See also ==
- Order of battle at Tannenberg

== Bibliography ==
- Cron, Hermann (2002). Imperial German Army 1914–18: Organisation, Structure, Orders-of-Battle [first published: 1937]. Helion & Co. ISBN 1-874622-70-1.
- Ellis, John; Cox, Michael (1993). The World War I Databook. Aurum Press Ltd. ISBN 1-85410-766-6.
- Sweetman, John (2002). Tannenberg 1914. Cassell & Co. ISBN 0-304-35635-2.
