= War Merit Cross (Baden) =

War Merit Cross Kriegsverdienstkreuz
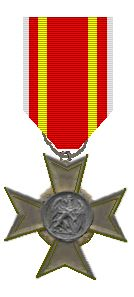
- Awarded for: War service
- Presented by: Grand Duchy of Baden
- Status: No longer awarded
- Established: 9 September 1916
- Ribbon of the decoration

The War Merit Cross (German: Kriegsverdienstkreuz) was a military decoration awarded by the Grand Duchy of Baden. Established 9 September 1916 by Frederick II, Grand Duke of Baden, the cross was awarded to recognize war service and voluntary work, primarily on the home-front.

== Appearance ==
The Baden War Merit Cross is made of gilded bronze, in the shape of a maltese cross. A laurel wreath shows between the arms of the cross. In the center of the obverse of the cross is a circular silver medallion. The medallion depicts the a crowned griffin holding a sword in its right hand and a shield with the arms of Baden in its left. The reverse of the medallion bears the crowned cipher of Grand Duke Friedrich II.
