= 17th Reserve Division =

17th Reserve Division (17. Reserve-Division)
- Active: 1914–1919
- Country: Germany
- Branch: Army
- Type: Infantry
- Size: Approx. 15,000
- Engagements: World War I: Battle of the Somme; Battle of Arras (1917); Passchendaele; Battle of Cambrai (1918)

The 17th Reserve Division (17. Reserve-Division) was a unit of the Imperial German Army in World War I. The division was formed on the mobilization of the German Army in August 1914. The division was disbanded in 1919 during the demobilization of the German Army after World War I. At the beginning of the war, it formed the IX Reserve Corps with the 18th Reserve Division.

== Recruitment ==
The division was composed primarily of troops from the Free and Hanseatic Cities and from Schleswig-Holstein. The division included one regular infantry brigade, the 81st, raised in Schleswig-Holstein and Lübeck, and one reserve infantry brigade, the 33rd, raised primarily in Hamburg and Bremen. Besides these regions, other troops of the division came from parts of the Province of Hanover adjoining Bremen and Hamburg.

== Combat chronicle ==
The 17th Reserve Division fought on the Western Front. It fought across Belgium in August 1914 and then occupied the line on the Aisne until September 1915. It then went to Flanders and the Artois, where it remained engaged in positional warfare until June 1916. From mid-July to late October 1916, it fought in the Battle of the Somme with only one interlude away from the front. The division then remained in the trenchlines along the Yser until May 1917. In May, it fought in the Battle of Arras. It remained in the Flanders region for the rest of the year and into 1918 and fought in the Battle of Passchendaele. In 1918, it occupied various parts of the line and fought against several Allied offensives, including in the second Battle of Cambrai. In 1918, Allied intelligence rated the division as first class.

== Order of battle on mobilization ==
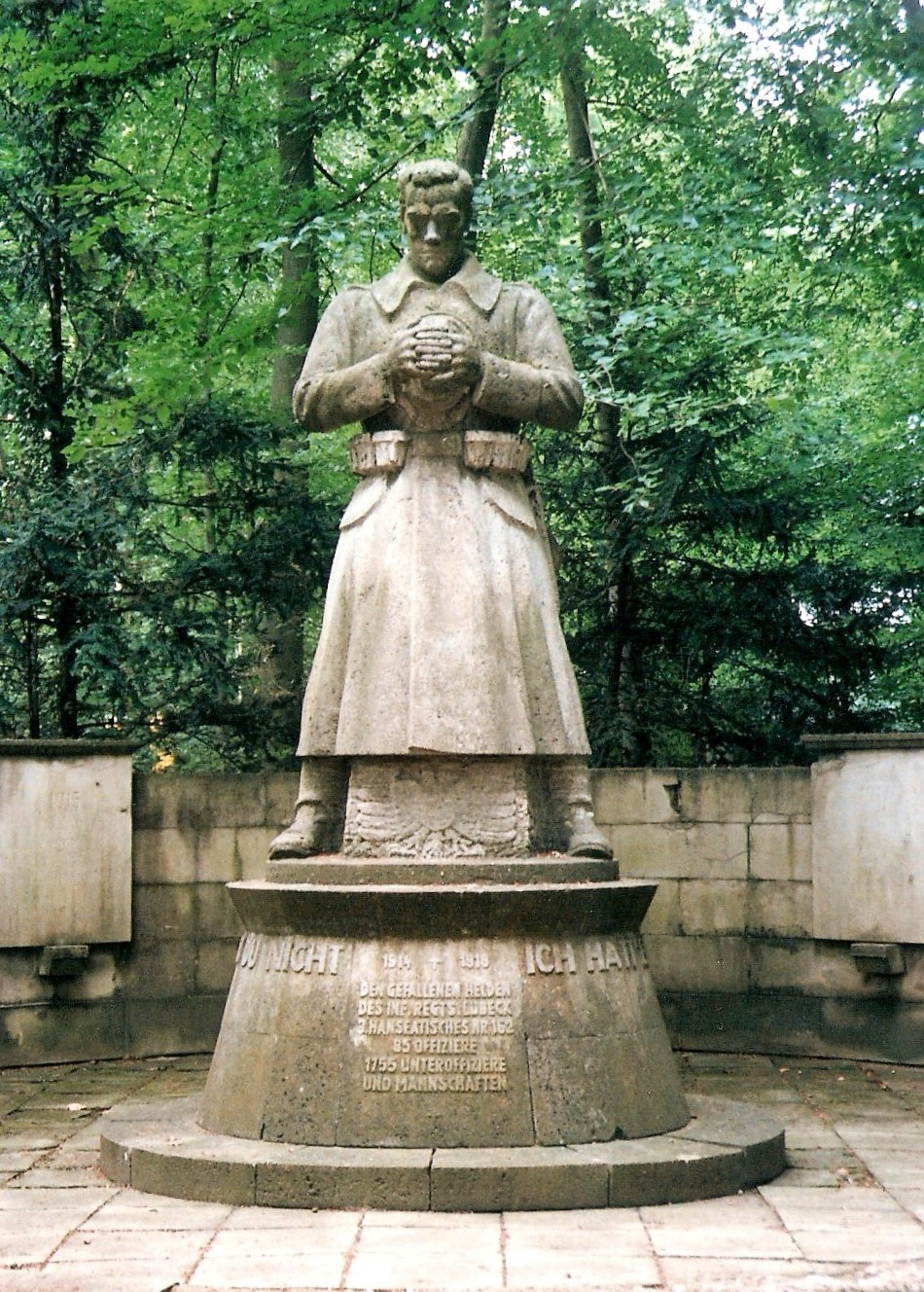
Memorial of the "Infantry Regiment Lübeck (3. hanseatisches) Nr. 162"

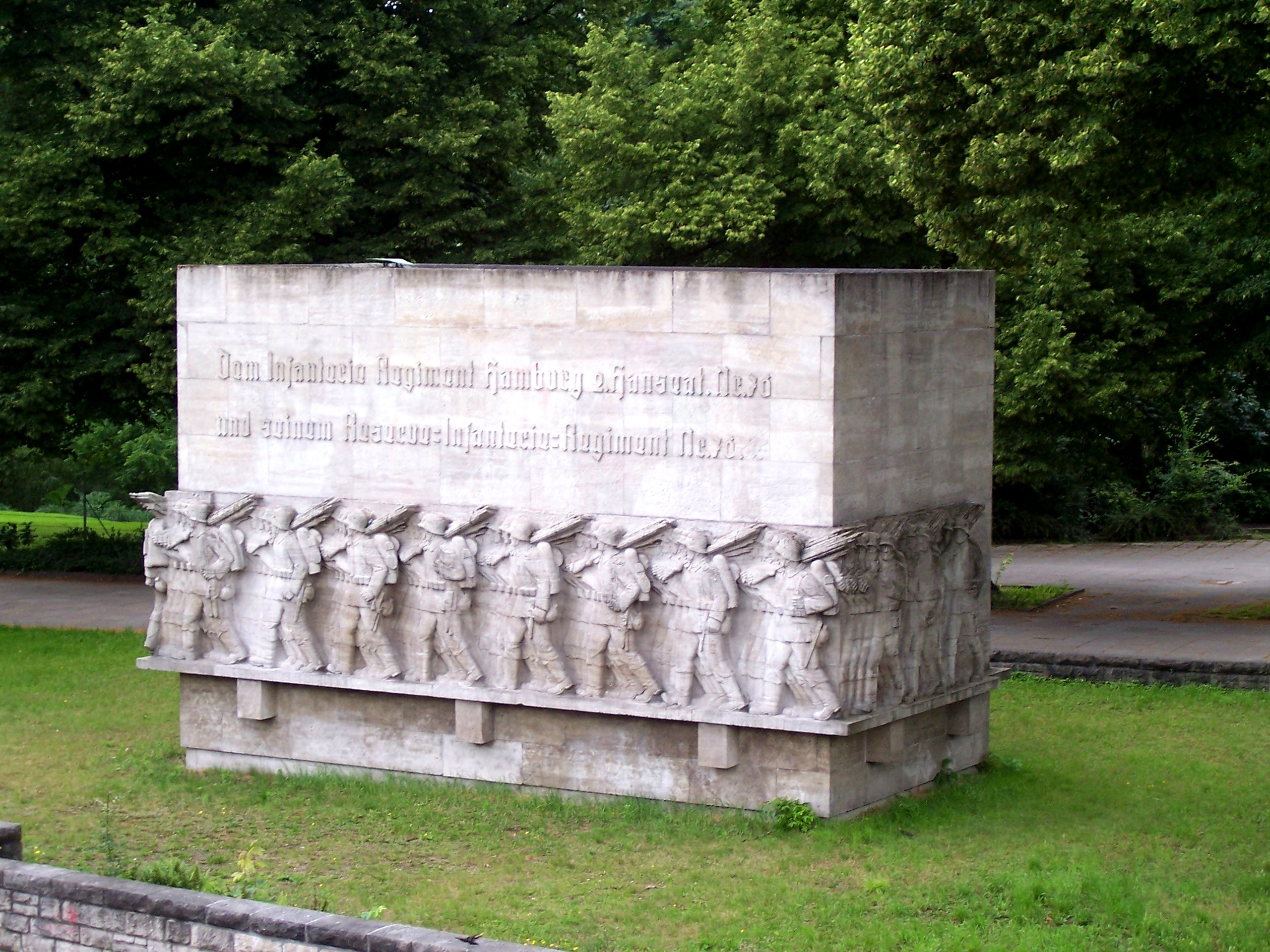
Memorial of the Reserve-Infanterie-Regiment Nr. 76 in Hamburg

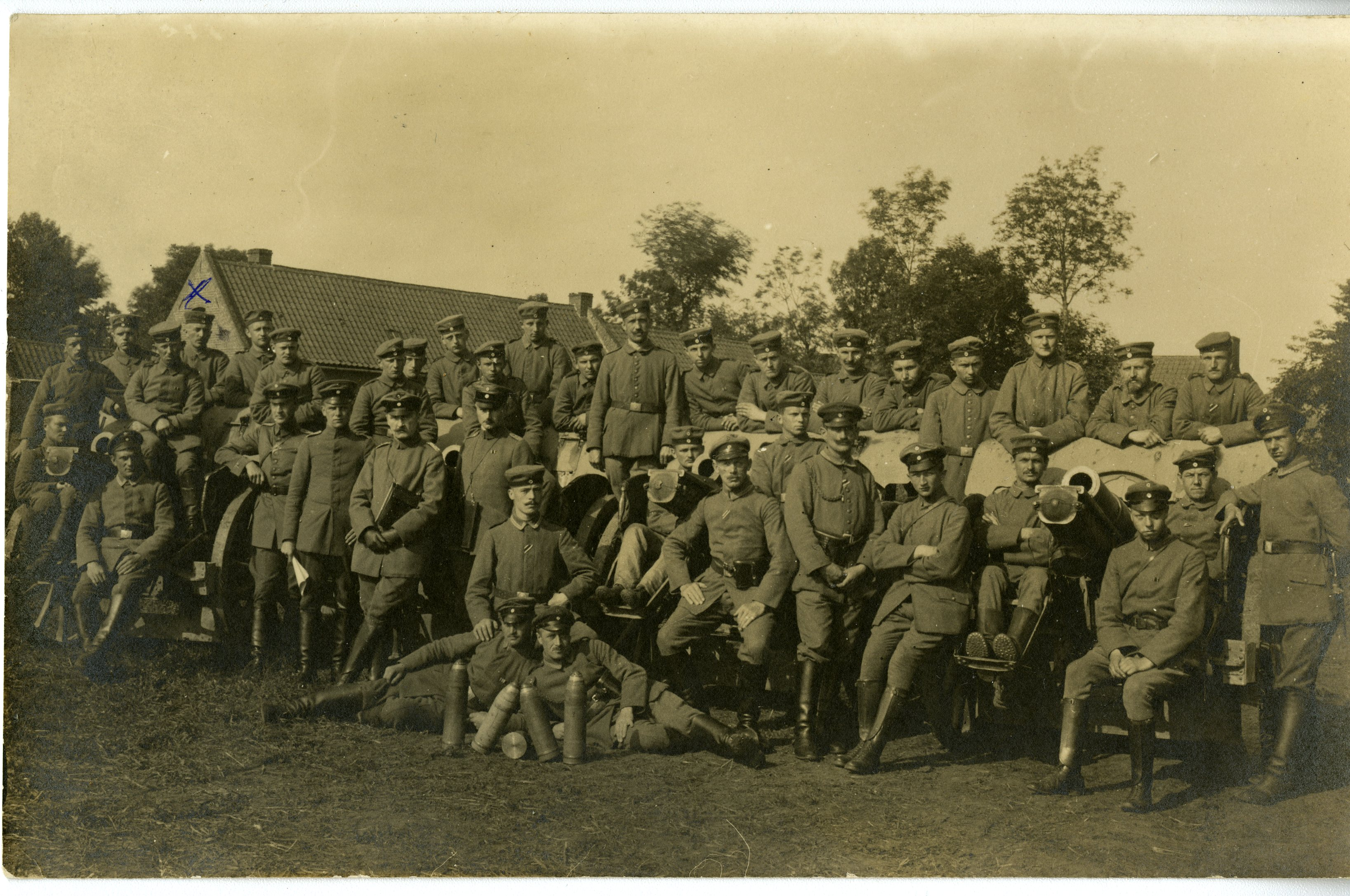
10th Battery, 3rd Battalion, 17th Reserve Artillery, 17th Reserve Division (Germany) C. 1917. This battery was issued these 1898-09 Light Field Howitzers in late March 1917.

The order of battle of the 17th Reserve Division on mobilization was as follows:

- 81. Infanterie-Brigade
  - Infanterie-Regiment Lübeck (3. Hanseatisches) Nr. 162
  - Schleswig-Holsteinisches Infanterie-Regiment Nr. 163
- 33. Reserve-Infanterie-Brigade
  - Reserve-Infanterie-Regiment Nr. 75
  - Reserve-Infanterie-Regiment Nr. 76
- Reserve-Husaren-Regiment Nr. 6
- Reserve-Feldartillerie-Regiment Nr. 17
- 4.Kompanie/Pionier-Bataillon Nr. 9

== Order of battle on March 28, 1918 ==
The 17th Reserve Division was triangularized in October 1916. Over the course of the war, other changes took place, including the formation of artillery and signals commands and a pioneer battalion. The order of battle on March 28, 1918, was as follows:

- 81. Infanterie-Brigade
  - Reserve-Infanterie-Regiment Nr. 76
  - Infanterie-Regiment Lübeck (3. Hanseatisches) Nr. 162
  - Schleswig-Holsteinisches Infanterie-Regiment Nr. 163
- 1.Eskadron/Reserve-Husaren-Regiment Nr. 6
- Artillerie-Kommandeur 110
  - Reserve-Feldartillerie-Regiment Nr. 17
- Stab Pionier-Bataillon Nr. 317
  - 4.Kompanie/Pionier-Bataillon Nr. 9
  - Pionier-Kompanie Nr. 340
  - Minenwerfer-Kompanie Nr. 217
- Divisions-Nachrichten-Kommandeur 417
