= Northern Command =

Northern Command can refer to one of the following:

- IRA Northern Command
- Northern Command (Israel)
- Northern Command (Pakistan)
- Northern Command (Australia)
- Northern Command (India), Indian Army
- Northern Theatre Command (India), Indian Armed Forces
- Northern Command (RAAF)
- Northern Command (United Kingdom)
- United States Northern Command
