= Jüdischer Friedhof Köln-Bocklemünd =

Jewish cemetery in Cologne, Germany

Coordinates: 50°58′17″N 6°52′17″E

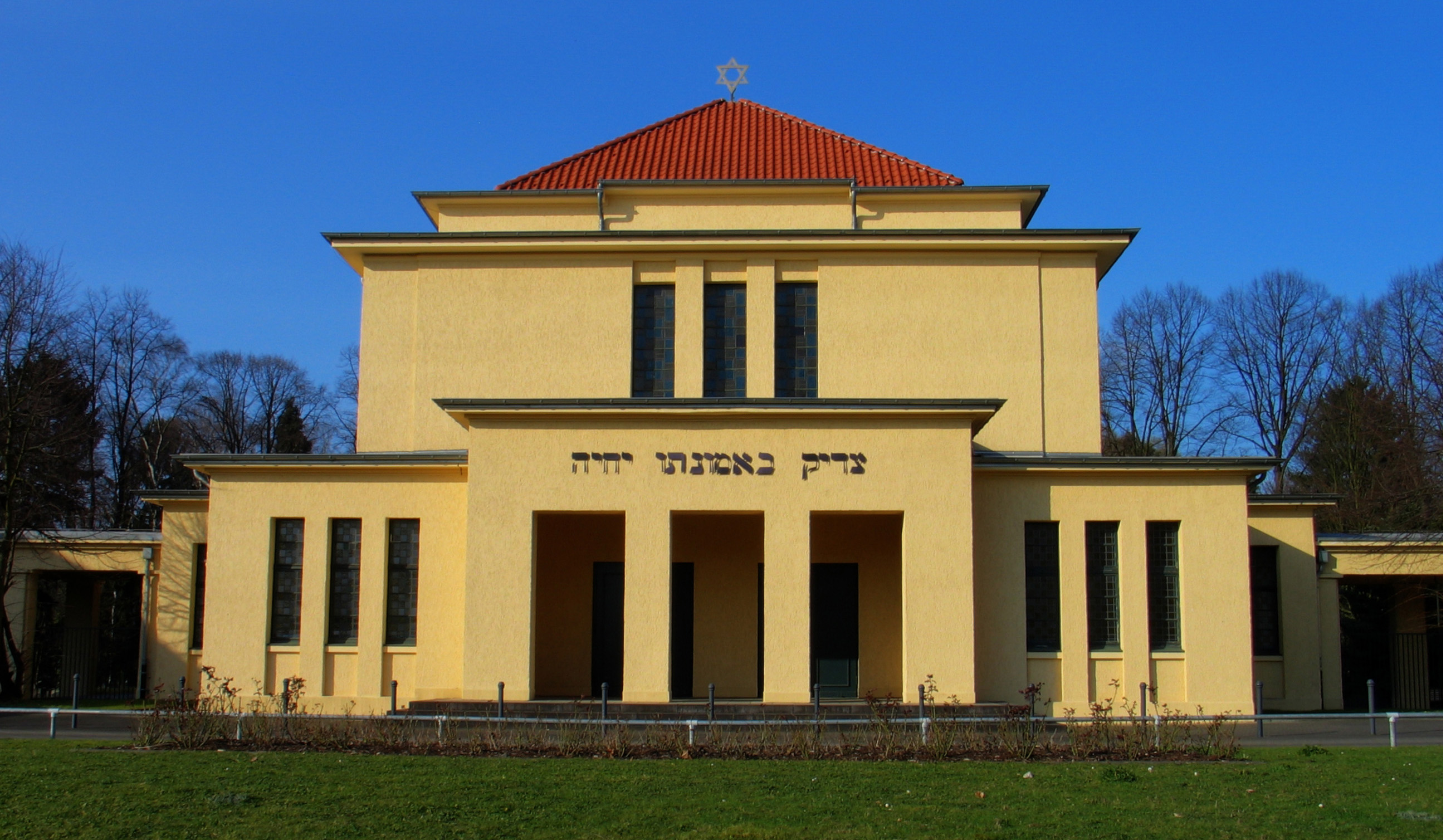

Jüdischer Friedhof Köln-Bocklemünd is a cemetery in Cologne, Germany. A Jewish burial site since 1918, many of its tombstones are noted for their extravagant artistic designs.
