= 18th Reserve Division =

18th Reserve Division (18. Reserve-Division)
- Active: 1914-1919
- Country: Germany
- Branch: Army
- Type: Infantry
- Size: Approx. 15,000
- Engagements: World War I: Battle of the Somme, Battle of Arras (1917), Passchendaele, Battle of Cambrai (1918)

The 18th Reserve Division (18. Reserve-Division) was a unit of the Imperial German Army in World War I. The division was formed on mobilization of the German Army in August 1914. The division was disbanded in 1919 during the demobilization of the German Army after World War I. At the beginning of the war, it formed the IX Reserve Corps with the 17th Reserve Division.

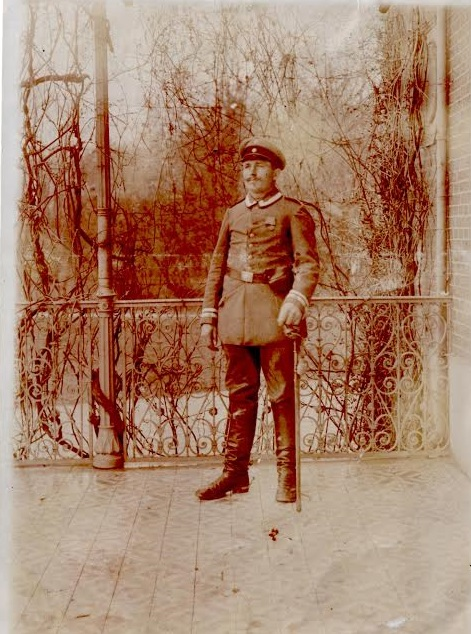
Paul Karl Albert Jüngling in formal uniform for the 18th Reserve Division

== Recruitment ==
The division was composed primarily of troops from Schleswig-Holstein, the Hanseatic Cities, and the Mecklenburg grand duchies. The 31st Reserve Infantry Regiment was a Hanseatic regiment, primarily recruited in Hamburg and Bremen. The 84th and 86th Reserve Infantry Regiments were raised in Schleswig, with one battalion of the 84th Reserve Infantry Regiment raised in the Grand Duchy of Mecklenburg-Strelitz. The 90th Reserve Infantry Regiment was raised in the Grand Duchy of Mecklenburg-Schwerin. The 9th Reserve Jäger Battalion was raised in Lauenburg, a former duchy on the Baltic coast which had passed from Denmark to Prussia in 1864.

== Combat chronicle ==
The 18th Reserve Division fought on the Western Front alongside its sister division, the 17th Reserve Division. It fought across Belgium in August 1914 and then occupied the line on the Aisne until September 1915. It then went to Flanders and the Artois, where it remained engaged in positional warfare until June 1916. From mid-July to late October 1916, it fought in the Battle of the Somme with only one interlude away from the front. The division then remained in the trenchlines along the Yser until May 1917. In May it fought in the Battle of Arras. It remained in the Flanders region for the rest of the year and into 1918 and fought in the Battle of Passchendaele. In 1918, it occupied various parts of the line and fought against several Allied offensives, including in the second Battle of Cambrai. In 1918, Allied intelligence rated the division as second class.

== Order of battle on mobilization ==
The order of battle of the 18th Reserve Division on mobilization was as follows:

- 34. Reserve-Infanterie-Brigade
  - Reserve-Infanterie-Regiment Nr. 31
  - Großherzoglich Mecklenburgisches Reserve-Infanterie-Regiment Nr. 90
- 35. Reserve-Infanterie-Brigade
  - Schleswigsches Reserve-Infanterie-Regiment Nr. 84
  - Schleswigsches Reserve-Infanterie-Regiment Nr. 86
  - Reserve Jäger-Bataillon Nr. 9
- Reserve-Husaren-Regiment Nr. 7
- Reserve-Feldartillerie-Regiment Nr. 18
- 1.Reserve-Kompanie/Schleswig-Holsteinisches Pionier-Bataillon Nr. 9
- 2.Reserve-Kompanie/Schleswig-Holsteinisches Pionier-Bataillon Nr. 9

== Order of battle on March 8, 1918 ==
The 18th Reserve Division was triangularized in March 1915. Over the course of the war, other changes took place, including the formation of artillery and signals commands and a pioneer battalion. The order of battle on March 8, 1918, was as follows:

- 35. Reserve-Infanterie-Brigade:
  - Reserve-Infanterie-Regiment Nr. 31
  - Schleswigsches Reserve-Infanterie-Regiment Nr. 84
  - Schleswigsches Reserve-Infanterie-Regiment Nr. 86
- 3.Eskadron/Husaren-Regiment Graf Goetzen (2. Schlesisches) Nr. 6
- Reserve-Feldartillerie-Regiment Nr. 18
- Stab II.Bataillon/Pionier-Regiment Nr. 9
  - 1.Reserve-Kompanie/Schleswig-Holsteinisches Pionier-Bataillon Nr. 9
  - 2.Reserve-Kompanie/Schleswig-Holsteinisches Pionier-Bataillon Nr. 9
  - Reserve-Scheinwerferzug 9
  - Minenwerfer-Kompanie Nr. 218
