= Martin Salomonski =

German rabbi, scholar and theologian (1881-1944)

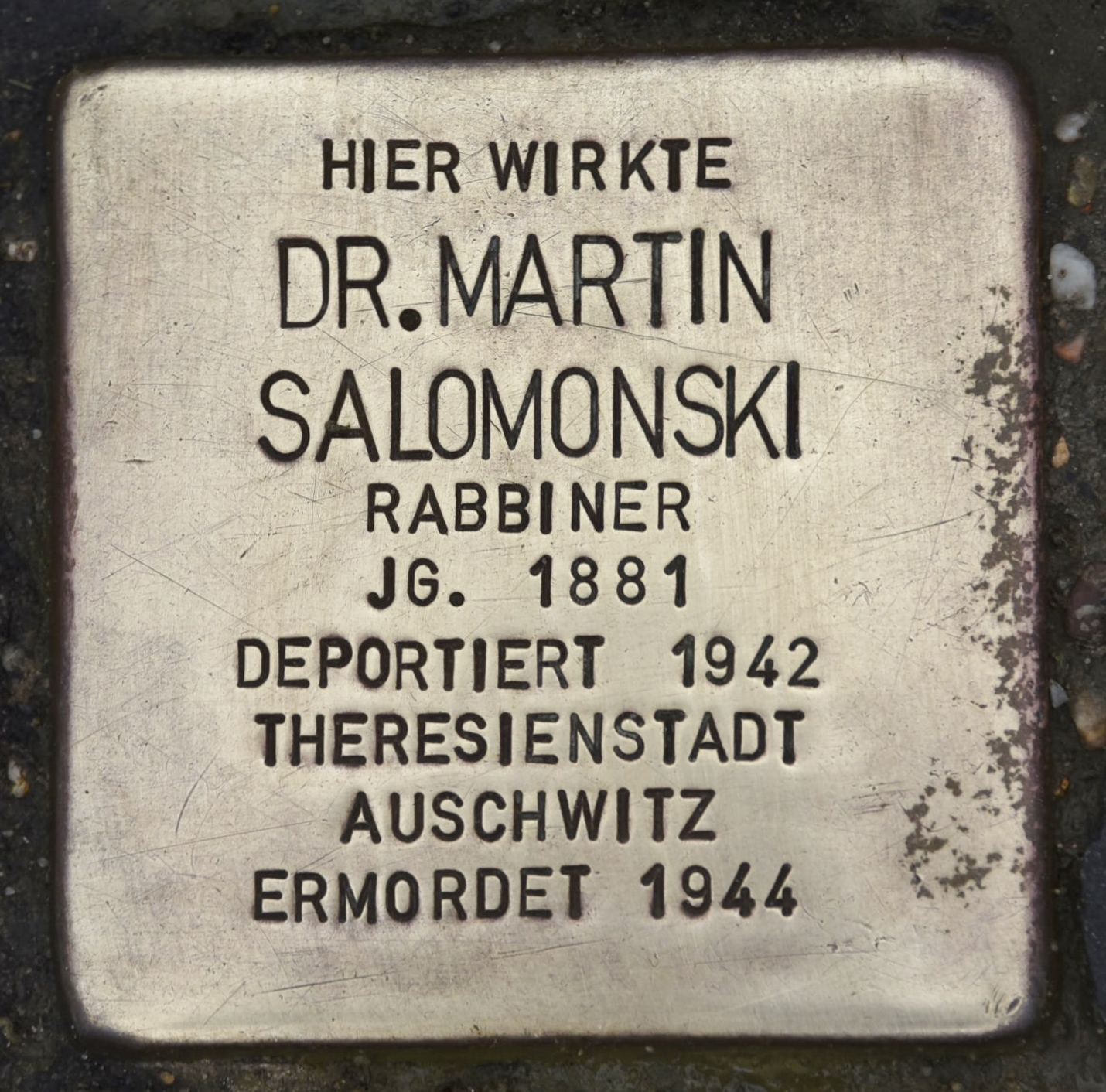
- Stolperstein in Frankfurt (Oder)

Personal life
- Born: Martin Meir Salomonski; 24 June 1881 Berlin, German Empire
- Died: 16 October 1944 (aged 63) Auschwitz, German Reich
- Spouse: Paula Baruch (m. 1910; dead 1923)
- Children: 6
- Parents: Adolf Abraham Salomonski (father); Bertha Koppenheim (mother)
- Notable work: Israel on the Moon (novel)
- Education: Berlinisches Gymnasium zum Grauen Kloster; Friedrich Wilhelm University of Berlin (PhD)
- Known for: Rabbi in Frankfurt (Oder) and in NS-Berlin
- Occupation: Rabbi

Religious life
- Religion: Judaism
- Denomination: Reform Judaism

Jewish leader
- Synagogue: New Synagogue
- Semikhah: Hochschule für die Wissenschaft des Judentums

Martin Salomonski (24 June 1881 – after 16 October 1944) was a 20th-century German rabbi, scholar, and theologian. During the First World War, Salomonski volunteered as a field rabbi in the Second Army from 1916 to 1918, for which he was awarded the Iron Cross in March 1917. He served as leader of Reform Judaism in his home town Berlin during the Nazi era and wrote in 1933 an utopian novel about Jews leaving the Earth and migrating to the Moon. He died in the Auschwitz concentration camp.

== Life ==
=== Youth ===
Martin Meir Salomonski was born on 24 June 1881 in Berlin, the second son of merchant Adolf Abraham Salomonski (born 20 February 1850 in Pinne; died 23 June 1915 in Berlin) and his wife Bertha, née Koppenheim (born 5 December 1857 in Grätz; died 28 October 1938 in Berlin). His parents' home and business premises were located at Alexanderstraße 1, in a prominent location near Alexanderplatz. He first attended the Jewish community's boys' school, then the Königstädtisches Gymnasium and later the Gymnasium zum Grauen Kloster.

In 1901, he received his school leaving certificate and began studying Oriental philology at the Friedrich Wilhelm University. At the same time, Salomonski enrolled at the Institute for Jewish Studies, where he passed his rabbinical examination on 20 July 1908.

=== Frankfurt (Oder) ===
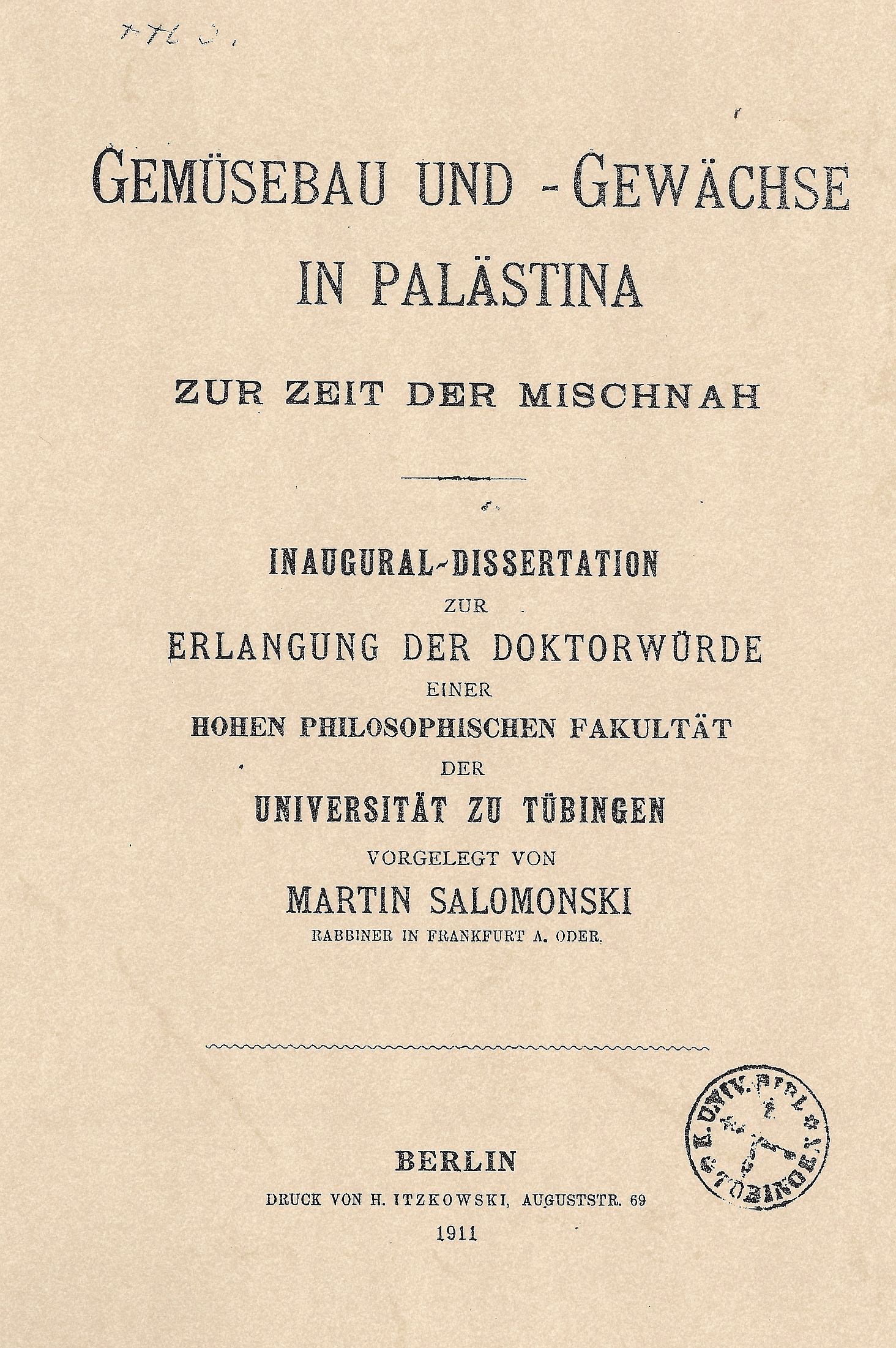
Cover page of his thesis Vegetable Cultivation and Crops in Palestine at the Time of the Mishnah

From 1908 to 1924, Rabbi Salomonski served the long-established synagogue community in Frankfurt (Oder). He lived first at Wilhelmplatz 23 and later at Lindenstraße 6 (now 18). During this period, he was highly active in communal organizations, joining the boards of the Provincial Association of Brandenburg Synagogue Communities and the Central German Rabbinical Association. He was also a member of both the Hardenberg Lodge and the reform-oriented Abraham Geiger Lodge. His commitment to public life was further demonstrated on July 25, 1915, when he participated in the ecumenical inauguration service for the Gronenfelde war cemetery.

In July 1910, he received his doctorate from the University of Tübingen with a dissertation entitled Vegetable Cultivation and Vegetables in Palestine at the Time of the Mishnah. The work dealt with vegetables mentioned in the Bible and Rabbinic literature.

Salomonski volunteered as a field rabbi with the 2nd Army during the First World War (1916–1918), a service for which he was awarded the Iron Cross in March 1917. He chronicled his experiences on the front in two books: Ein Jahr an der Somme (A Year on the Somme, 1917) and Jüdische Seelsorge an der Westfront (Jewish Pastoral Care on the Western Front, 1918). A scene from his deployment area near Le Cateau, France, was also later featured in his novel, Zwei im andern Land (Israel on the Moon, 1933/34).

Salomonski’s personal life was marked by tragedy in 1923 when his wife, Paula Baruch, whom he had married in 1910, died from a flu infection. The couple had four daughters: Eva (1911–1997), Hilde (1916–2005), Franziska (1919–1990), and Anni (1919–2011). Crucially, all four daughters successfully escaped the Holocaust by emigrating to various countries.

== Memory ==
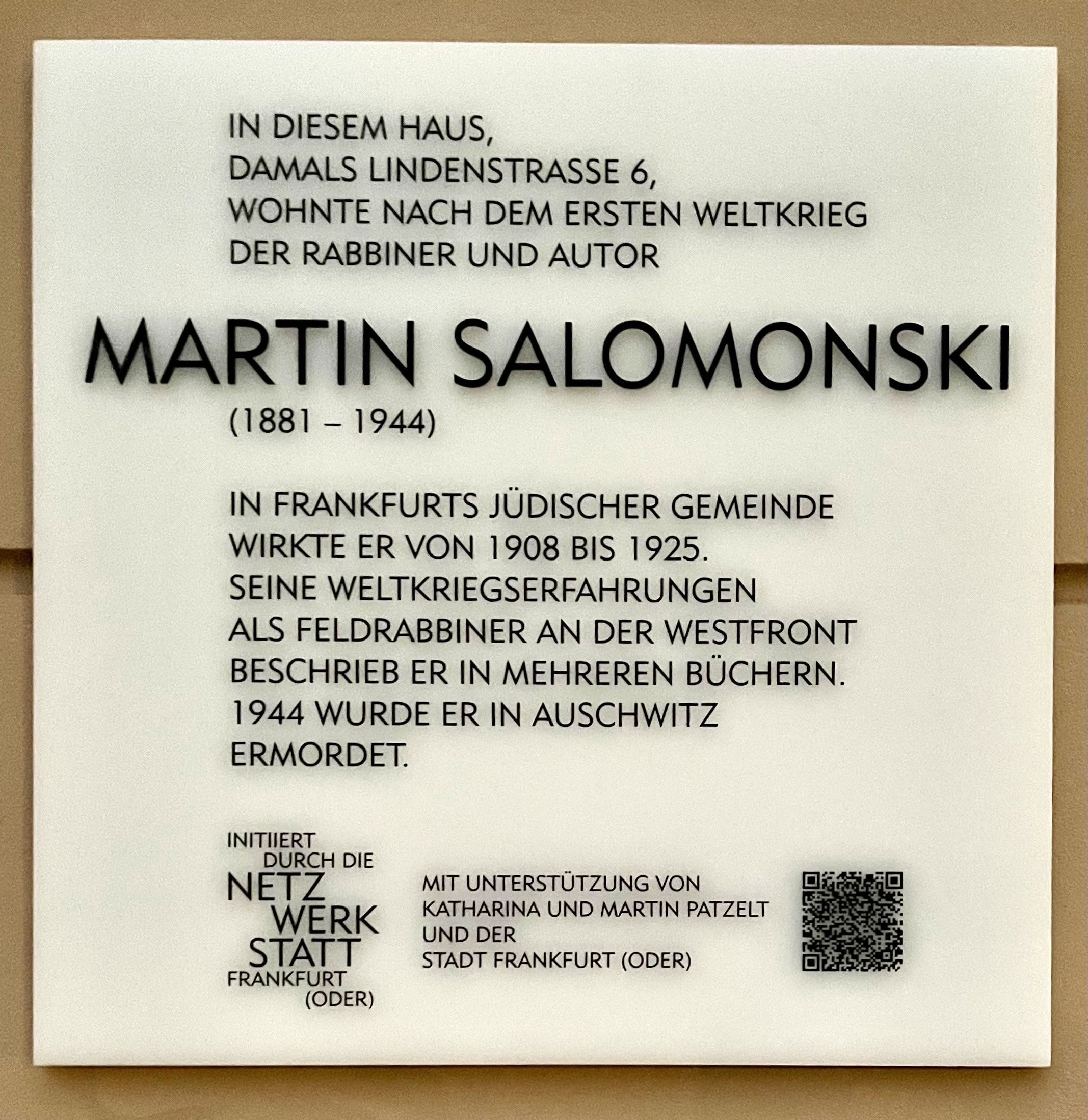
Commemorative plaque at Salomonski's former flat at Lindenstraße 6/18

The Jewish community in Frankfurt (Oder) honours its former rabbi with a permanent exhibition in a separate memorial room in the synagogue at Halbe Stadt 30.

On 5 July 2010, 100 years after Salomonski began his work as a rabbi in Frankfurt (Oder), a Stolperstein was laid for him in the centre of the city at Brunnenplatz. The inscription reads: Worked here / Dr. Martin Salomonski / Rabbi / Born 1881 / Deported 1942 / Theresienstadt / Auschwitz / Murdered 1944.

Since 7 November 2024, a commemorative plaque donated by former Frankfurt mayor Martin Patzelt marks Salomonski's flat at Lindenstraße 6 (now 18).

== Works ==
=== Writings ===
- Thesis: Gemüseanbau und -gewächse in Palästina zur Zeit der Mischnah. Inaugural-Dissertation zur Erlangung der Doktorwürde by Martin Salomonski, Tübingen 1910, Berlin 1911. (Digitalisat)
- War diary: Ein Jahr an der Somme. Von Feldrabbiner Dr. Martin Salomonski. Trowitzsch & Sohn, Frankfurt an der Oder 1917. (Digitalisat)
- War diary: Jüdische Seelsorge an der Westfront. Überreicht vom Centralverein deutscher Staatsbürger jüdischen Glaubens. Verlag Louis Lamm, Berlin 1918. (Digitalisat)

=== Novels ===
- Die geborene Tugendreich. Großstadtroman. Brüder-Verlagsgesellschaft, Berlin 1928. (Digitalisat)
  - Die geborene Tugendreich. Großstadtroman. (sample) With contemporary reviews and preface by Alexander Fromm. Berlin 2020, ISBN 978-3-7529-7863-6.
- Zwei im andern Land. Serial for the Jüdisch-liberale Zeitung from 1 June (No. 5) until 22 Dezember 1933 (No. 36). (Digitalisat)
  - Zwei im andern Land. Benjamin Harz Verlag, Berlin/Vienna 1934.
  - Zwei im andern Land. With contemporary reviews and an afterword by Alexander Fromm. Vergangenheitsverlag, Berlin 2021, ISBN 978-3-86408-264-1.
    - English version: Israel on the Moon. A Berlin novel from the year 1933. (sample) Berlin 2022, ISBN 978-3-7549-4651-0.
