= IX Reserve Corps =

Military unit of the German Army in World War I

- German: IX. Reserve-Korps
- Flag of the Staff of a Generalkommando (1871–1918)
- Active: 2 August 1914 – after November 1918
- Country: German Empire
- Type: Corps
- Size: c. 38,000 (on formation)
- Engagements: World War I: Battle of the Frontiers

Insignia
- Abbreviation: IX RK

The IX Reserve Corps (German: IX. Reserve-Korps / IX RK) was a corps-level command of the German Army in World War I.

== Formation ==
IX Reserve Corps was formed on the outbreak of the war in August 1914 as part of the mobilisation of the Army. It was initially commanded by General der Infanterie Max von Boehn, brought out of retirement. It was still in existence at the end of the war in the 5th Army, Heeresgruppe Gallwitz on the Western Front.

=== Structure on formation ===
On formation in August 1914, IX Reserve Corps consisted of two divisions, made up of reserve units. In general, Reserve Corps and Reserve Divisions were weaker than their active counterparts;

- Reserve Infantry Regiments did not always have three battalions nor necessarily contain a machine gun company
- Reserve Jäger Battalions did not have a machine gun company on formation
- Reserve Cavalry Regiments consisted of just three squadrons
- Reserve Field Artillery Regiments usually consisted of two abteilungen of three batteries each
- Corps Troops generally consisted of a Telephone Detachment and four sections of munition columns and trains

The IX Reserve Corps was exceptional as it formed the major part of the North Army so was provided with more Corps Troops than other Reserve Corps: a Foot Artillery Battalion, a Pioneer Regiment and a Field Airship Detachment.

In summary, IX Reserve Corps mobilised with 25 infantry battalions, 5 machine gun companies (30 machine guns), 6 cavalry squadrons, 12 field artillery batteries (72 guns), 4 heavy batteries (16 guns), a Field Airship Detachment and 7 pioneer companies. 17th Reserve Division was slightly stronger than the norm as it included an active infantry brigade.

Corps	Division	Brigade	Units
IX Reserve Corps	17th Reserve Division	81st Infantry Brigade	162nd Infantry Regiment
IX Reserve Corps	17th Reserve Division	81st Infantry Brigade	163rd Infantry Regiment
IX Reserve Corps	17th Reserve Division	33rd Reserve Infantry Brigade	75th Reserve Infantry Regiment
IX Reserve Corps	17th Reserve Division	33rd Reserve Infantry Brigade	76th Reserve Infantry Regiment
IX Reserve Corps	17th Reserve Division		6th Reserve Hussar Regiment
IX Reserve Corps	17th Reserve Division		17th Reserve Field Artillery Regiment
IX Reserve Corps	17th Reserve Division		4th Company, 9th Pioneer Battalion
IX Reserve Corps	17th Reserve Division		17th Reserve Divisional Pontoon Train
IX Reserve Corps	17th Reserve Division		9th Reserve Medical Company
IX Reserve Corps	18th Reserve Division	34th Reserve Infantry Brigade	31st Reserve Infantry Regiment
IX Reserve Corps	18th Reserve Division	34th Reserve Infantry Brigade	90th Reserve Infantry Regiment
IX Reserve Corps	18th Reserve Division	35th Reserve Infantry Brigade	84th Reserve Infantry Regiment
IX Reserve Corps	18th Reserve Division	35th Reserve Infantry Brigade	86th Reserve Infantry Regiment
IX Reserve Corps	18th Reserve Division	35th Reserve Infantry Brigade	9th Reserve Jäger Battalion
IX Reserve Corps	18th Reserve Division		7th Reserve Hussar Regiment
IX Reserve Corps	18th Reserve Division		18th Reserve Field Artillery Regiment
IX Reserve Corps	18th Reserve Division		1st Reserve Company, 9th Pioneer Battalion
IX Reserve Corps	18th Reserve Division		2nd Reserve Company, 9th Pioneer Battalion
IX Reserve Corps	18th Reserve Division		13th Reserve Medical Company
IX Reserve Corps	Corps Troops		II Battalion, 2nd Guards Foot Artillery Regiment
IX Reserve Corps	Corps Troops		31st Pioneer Regiment
IX Reserve Corps	Corps Troops		9th Reserve Telephone Detachment
IX Reserve Corps	Corps Troops		5th Field Airship Detachment
IX Reserve Corps	Corps Troops		Munition Trains and Columns corresponding to the III Reserve Corps

== Combat chronicle ==
On mobilisation, IX Reserve Corps was assigned to the North Army, which was held back in Schleswig to defend the German North Sea Coast in case of British landings. It was soon transferred to the Western Front, joining 1st Army in late August.

== Commanders ==
IX Reserve Corps had the following commanders during its existence:

From	Rank	Name
2 August 1914	General der Infanterie	Max von Boehn
2 February 1917	Generalleutnant	Viktor Kühne
12 March 1917	Generalleutnant	Karl Dieffenbach

== See also ==
- German Army order of battle (1914)
- German Army order of battle, Western Front (1918)

== Bibliography ==
- Cron, Hermann (2002). Imperial German Army 1914-18: Organisation, Structure, Orders-of-Battle [first published: 1937]. Helion & Co. ISBN 1-874622-70-1.
- Ellis, John; Cox, Michael (1993). The World War I Databook. Aurum Press Ltd. ISBN 1-85410-766-6.
- Haythornthwaite, Philip J. (1996). The World War One Source Book. Arms and Armour. ISBN 1-85409-351-7.
