= Reichsbund jüdischer Frontsoldaten =

Organization of German-Jewish soldiers

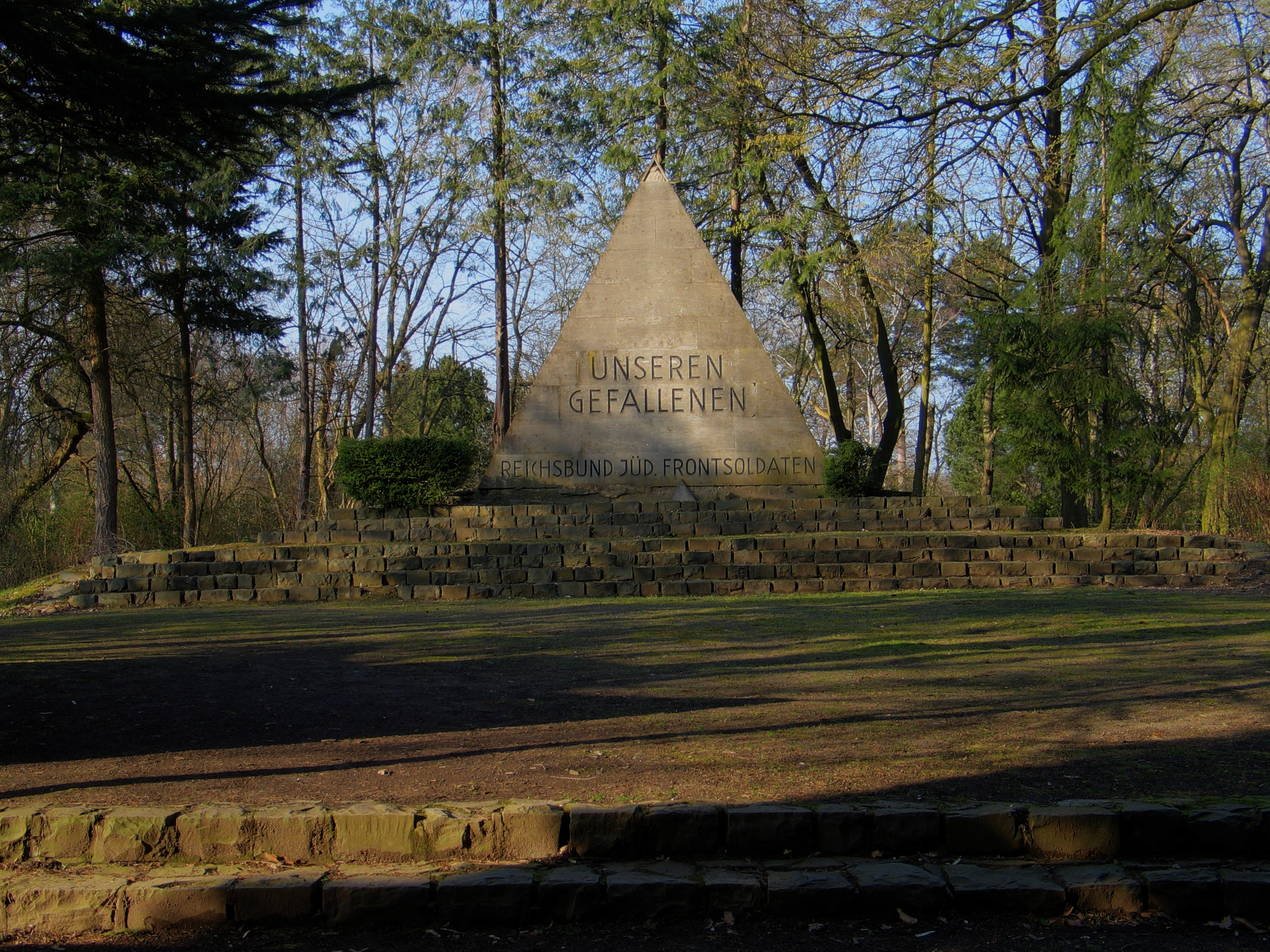
Memorial at the Jüdischer Friedhof Köln-Bocklemünd

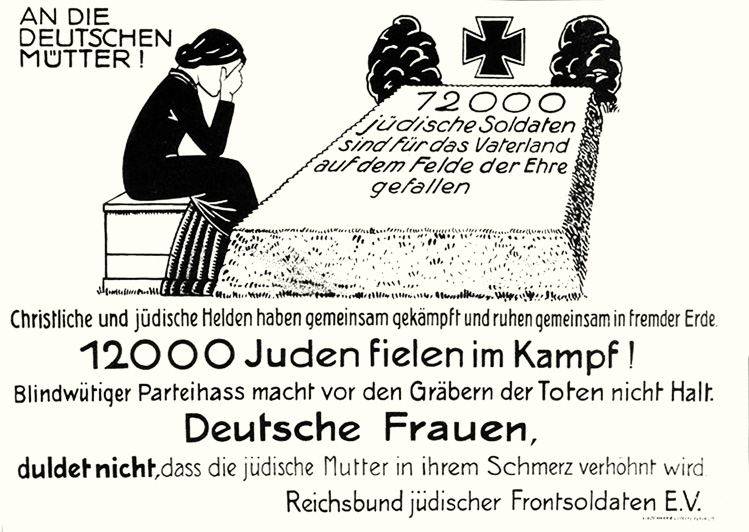
An RJF leaflet, published in 1920. Inscription at the top: To the German mothers! On the tomb: 12,000 Jewish soldiers fell on the field of honor for the fatherland. And below: Christian and Jewish heroes fought side by side and rest side by side in foreign land. 12,000 Jews were killed in action! Furious party hatred does not stop at the graves of the dead. German women, do not tolerate that a Jewish mother is scorned in her grief. Reich Federation of Jewish Front-Line Soldiers (Registered Association)

The Reich Federation of Jewish Front-Line Soldiers (German: Reichsbund jüdischer Frontsoldaten, RJF) was an organization of German-Jewish soldiers founded in February 1919 by Leo Löwenstein in the aftermath of World War I to demonstrate Jewish loyalty to the former German Empire and Jewish German nationalism. The organization advocated for Jewish veteran rights as equal German citizens until they were dissolved in 1938.

== History ==
=== Origin ===
In 1918, German antisemites claimed that the Jews had stabbed Germany in the back (Dolchstosslegende) by avoiding combat and treating the war as a profiteering opportunity. The rise of this antisemitic sentiment in Germany was shown within veteran activities as right-leaning groups began to protest the inclusion of Jews in remembrance services. In response, German-Jewish veterans met in Berlin and formed the Reichsbund jüdischer Frontsoldaten in 1919 with Leo Löwenstein as their leader. The RjF would eventually become the second largest Jewish organization in Germany with average numbers ranging from 30,000 to 40,000 members. The membership was male-dominated since it was organized by front-line soldiers. The essence of the Reichsbund jüdischer Frontsoldaten (RjF) was that of a defensive organization. The goal of the RjF was to organize former Jewish Veterans to defend and portray the sacrifice of themselves and their comrades during World War I as a method to combat antisemitism and the changing political landscape.

The Reichsbund emphasized that 85,000 Jewish soldiers had fought for the German Empire in World War I, and 12,000 had died, which placed their loyalty to Germany beyond any reasonable doubt. Jews had received 30,000 medals and awards during the war. At its high point the Reichsbund had 55,000 members. This large membership status made the RJF an organization with multiple political identities ranging from right to left leaning.

=== Termination ===
Ultimately, by 1935 laws were enacted banning Jewish participation in armed forces, signaling the loss of RjF advocacy power. The enactment of the Nuremberg Laws was shocking to its members after advocating for integration into German society. Its activities were outlawed by the Nazis in 1936, and in 1938 it was dissolved.

== Ideology ==
As a war veterans group, the Reichsbund jüdischer Frontsoldaten believed that Jewish war veterans should be honored alongside non-Jewish war veterans from World War I. Throughout the organization's existence, even when the Nazis were in power, the RjF firmly believed in their rights to live in an integrated German society because Jewish citizens had fought and died for Germany. Compared to similar veteran groups at the time, the Reichsbund jüdischer Frontsoldaten generally upheld German-nationalist and anti-Zionist ideals. However, the political makeup of the RjF was also widely varied, with both right- and left-leaning members. This makeup led to a complicated organization in regard to political action. Some members and aspects of the RjF were Zionist in orientation, while others were merely dedicated to the advancement of former German Jewish Soldiers. Because of these differing political orientations, they had members with political beliefs ranging from communism and socialism to right-leaning views in line with German society at the time.

The Reichsbund regarded the German Reich as the mother country of all German Jews. The RjF also advocated for the integration of the Jewish people into German society.

The group stated: "The RJF sees the basis of its work as complete allegiance to the German homeland. It does not have any goal or desire outside of this German homeland, and sharply rejects any movement which wishes to bring us German Jews to a position of outsiders in relation to this German homeland."

== Activism ==
=== Activism before the Third Reich ===
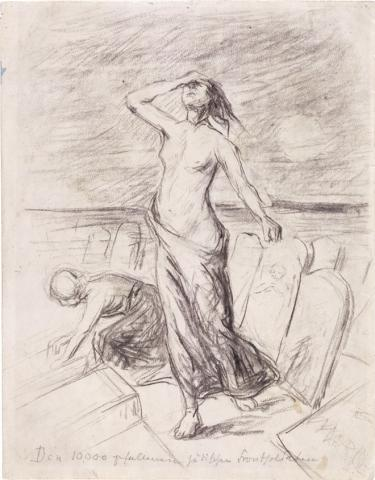
Circa 1929 by Max Liebermann as a dramatization of the pain suffered by those affected by the deaths of Jewish soldiers in WWI

Due to the organization's emphasis on Jewish soldier's efforts in the war, the Reichsbund participated in memorial and event planning, as well as the construction of memorials. The RjF also mobilized in a multitude of ways to defend Jewish Veterans, and Jewish rights outright within Germany. In 1932, right before Hitler's rise, The RjF held an event that was attended by many German elite to celebrate the publishing of the Gedenkbuch, a book that listed the combat records of over 10,500 fallen Jewish Soldiers in WWI. Outside of their advocacy, RjF members worked with other veteran groups, even attending lectures by non-Jewish organizations. The Reichsbund also advocated for Jewish sport and agriculture and essentially created a youth league program. Some members of the RjF engaged in colonialist activities seeking the restoration of German colonies lost in the wake of WWI.

=== Activism under Nazi rule ===
The RjF knew of the threat of the NSDAP and Hitler and attempted to curb the rise of the Nazis by protesting the political party. Antisemitic policy in 1933, with the rise of Nazi Germany, increased and soon the Nazis outlawed Jews from working in the public service. However, World War I veterans were exempt from these policies. The RjF claimed responsibility for this exemption for their members, and continued correspondence with government officials, working to retain their rights as German citizens. This was controversial for many German Jews, as there was disagreement as to whether they should integrate into German society or leave Germany altogether, with Zionist groups in favor of the latter option. These early strides by the RjF were not just in protecting Jewish Veterans' rights to work but also their benefits, as the RjF in 1933 negotiated with the Nazis to ensure that wounded Jewish veterans would not be treated differently and would maintain their veteran benefits. The RjF also worked to create social activities for members such as sports leagues. The RjF in an attempt to show German patriotism and to have a Jewish presence remain in the Wehrmacht, petitioned the German military and Nazi party up to Hitler to allow the group to form a segregated Jewish Division within the army. Their request was not even acknowledged, but if enacted they would have had enough Jewish soldiers to support multiple units having an estimated 50,000 potential Jewish soldiers for Hitler's Wehrmacht.

== Re-founding ==
This group was reestablished in November 2006, with the name Bund Jüdischer Soldaten. The current group embodies similar goals to the original Reichsbund Jüdischer Frontsoldaten, aiming to recognize and preserve the memory of Jewish war veterans in Germany. They emphasize the remembrance of German-Jewish soldiers who lost their lives in World War I.
