= Wilhelm Frankl =

German flying ace (1893–1917)

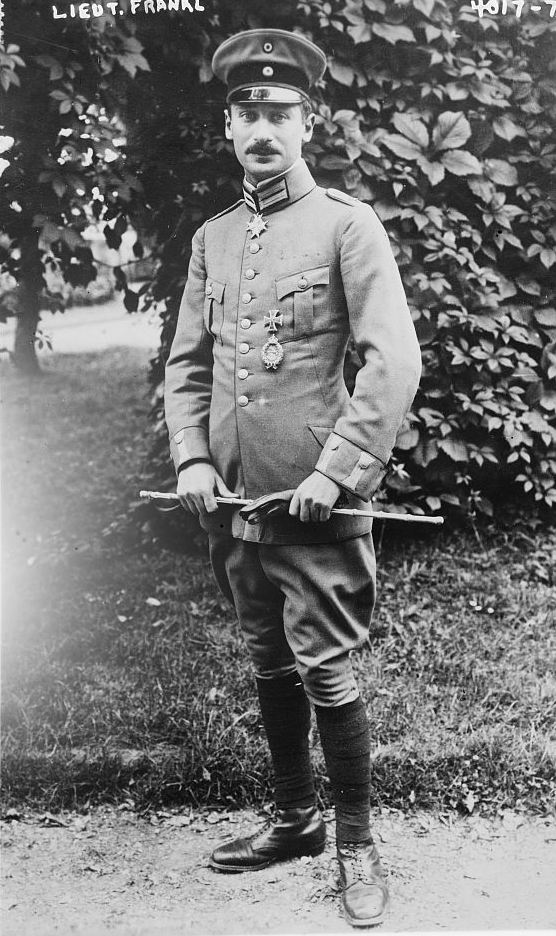
- Frankl in 1916
- Born: 20 December 1893; Hamburg, Germany
- Died: 8 April 1917 (aged 23); Vitry-Sailly, France
- Burial place: Lusienkirchhof II, Charlottenburg, German Empire
- Military career
- Allegiance: German Empire
- Branch: Luftstreitkräfte
- Service years: 1914–1917
- Rank: Leutnant
- Units: Feldflieger Abteilung 40; Kampfeinsitzerkommando Vaux; Jagdstaffel 4
- Commands: Jagdstaffel 4
- Awards: Pour le Mérite; Iron Cross; Royal House Order of Hohenzollern

Wilhelm Frankl (20 December 1893 – 8 April 1917), recipient of the Pour le Mérite, the Royal House Order of Hohenzollern, and the Iron Cross, was a World War I fighter ace credited with 20 aerial victories. He scored his first aerial victory with a carbine on 10 May 1915, before the Fokker Eindecker, the world's first dedicated fighter airplane, came into use. Once Frankl was equipped with an Eindecker, he became part of Germany's air superiority offensive, the Fokker Scourge, shooting down eight more enemy airplanes. He became one of the first eight aces in Germany's service, and one of its first winners of the prestigious Pour le Mérite. As such, he was appointed to lead one of the world's first fighter squadrons, Jagdstaffel 4. Although he died fighting for Germany on 8 April 1917, in later years the Nazis would ignore his wartime conversion to Christianity, and expunge his heroic record because he was Jewish.

== Personal life ==
Frankl was born the son of a Jewish businessman in Hamburg on 20 December 1893. He later moved to Frankfurt am Main, and then to Berlin. After he graduated from school, he pursued an interest in flying by attending Germany's hotbed of prewar aviation at Johannisthal. His instructor was Germany's first female pilot, Melli Beese. On 20 July 1913, Frankl earned pilot's license number 49.

The outbreak of World War I sparked Frankl's volunteering to fly for his country. His flying ability and his personality both commended him to his superiors. While his professional life took off, so did his personal life. He fell in love with the daughter of Austrian Naval Kapitän zur See Edmund Stroll. Frankl converted to Christianity and married his love in early 1917.

== Aerial victories ==
Before the concept of the synchronized machine gun firing safely through the plane's propeller became a practical reality, aerial victories were virtually nonexistent. Nevertheless, on 10 May 1915, while flying as an observer in Feldflieger Abteilung 40 (FFA 40), Frankl used a carbine to shoot down a French Voisin. He was awarded an Iron Cross First Class for this feat.

It took exactly eight months for his second triumph. On 10 January 1916, while flying a Fokker Eindecker with KEK Vaux, he downed another Voisin; this one was armed with a 37mm Hotchkiss cannon. By 1 February, his victory total stood at four. Three months later, on 4 May, he became an ace. On 16 May, he was promoted from Vizefeldwebel into the officer's ranks as a Leutnant. He scored once more on 21 May. He was awarded the Knight's Cross with Swords of the Royal House Order of Hohenzollern during late May, followed by the Hanseatic Cross of Hamburg. By this time, Frankl was one of only eight aces in the German flying service. Frankl's gallantry earned him the Pour le Mérite after his eighth confirmed victory; the Blue Max was awarded on 16 July 1916.

His guns rested until 2 August, when he tallied a Morane-Saulnier L. A double victory followed on 10 August. On 1 September 1916, he then transferred to Prussian Jagdstaffel 4 (Jasta 4) as it was formed from KEK Vaux, to fly Halberstadt D.Vs. On 1 January 1917, he succeeded to command of the squadron.

Four wins in September and two in October made him a triple ace. In late December 1916, Frankl succeeded to command of Jasta 4. Then, after a six-month hiatus, he scored a quadruple victory on 6 April 1917, and his twentieth win on the following day.

== Killed in action ==
Frankl's end came on 8 April 1917. While battling Bristol F.2 Fighters of No. 48 Squadron RFC, his Albatros D.III lost its lower wing under the stress of combat manoeuvres, and he and his collapsed craft fell 800 m (2,600 ft). He died between the communes of Vitry and Sailly in France. Wilhelm Frankl was buried in Charlottenburg.

== His legacy ==
Frankl on the cover of the Frankfurter Illustrierte

Frankl's Jewish heritage resulted in his name and exploits being omitted from accounts of World War I fliers who won the Blue Max. After the end of World War II, Frankl's name was restored to the roll of German aces.

On 22 November 1973, the German Air Force, at the time referred to as the Bundesluftwaffe, named the air force barracks in Neuburg an der Donau after Wilhelm Frankl. The "Wilhelm-Frankl-Kaserne" is home to the Bundesluftwaffe's Taktisches Luftwaffengeschwader 74.

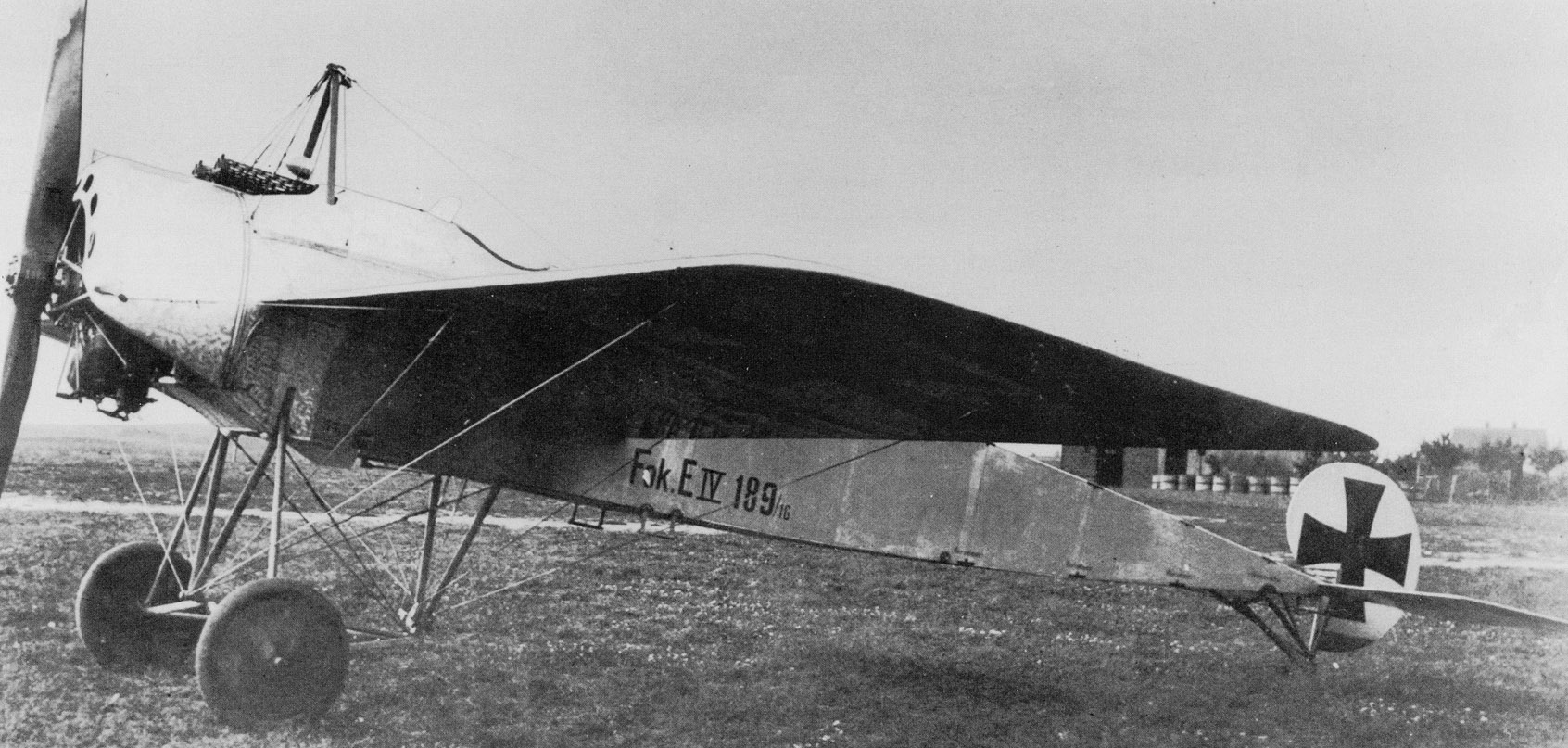
The Fokker Eindecker Frankl flew was the world's first dedicated fighter plane.

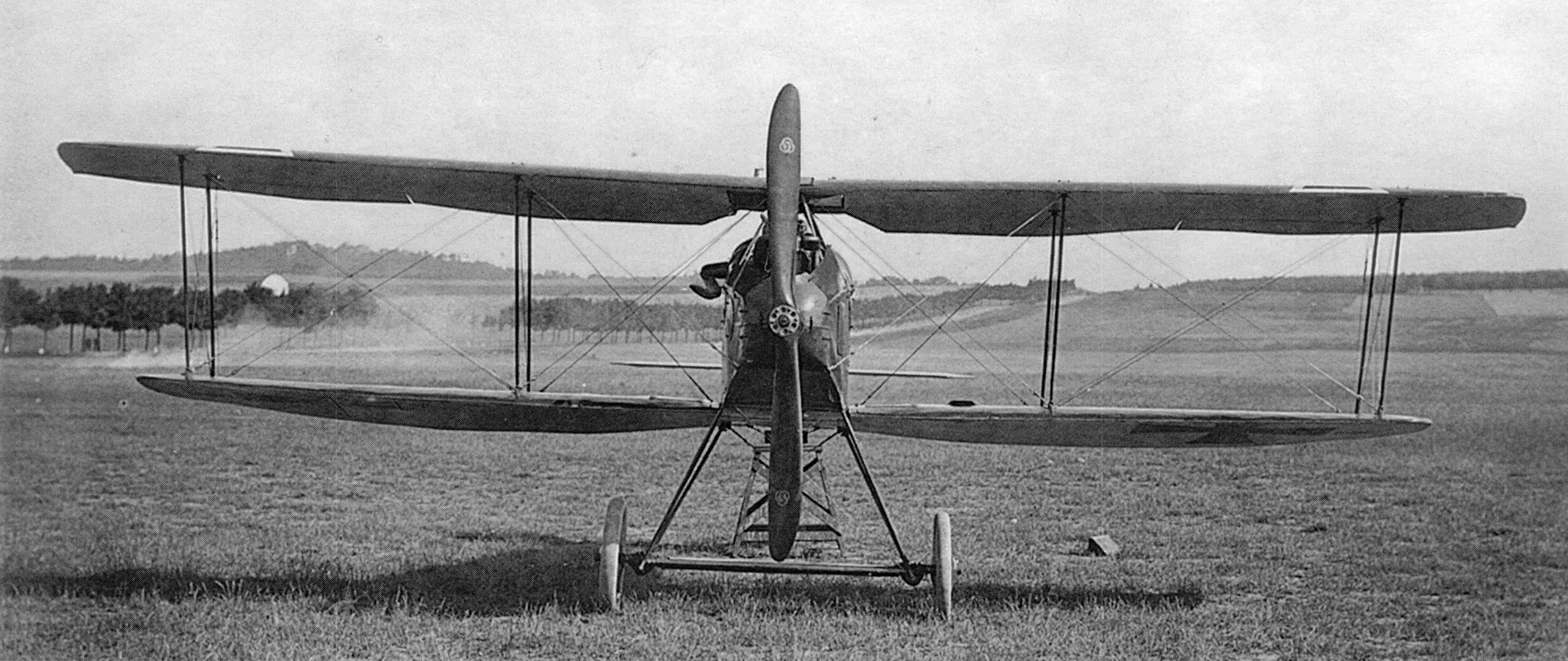
Frankl later flew a more modern Halberstadt fighter for Jagdstaffel 4.

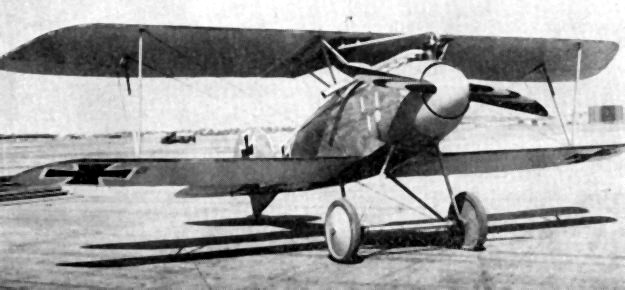
Frankl was flying an Albatros D.III on his last mission.
