= List of recipients of the Pour le Mérite (military class) =

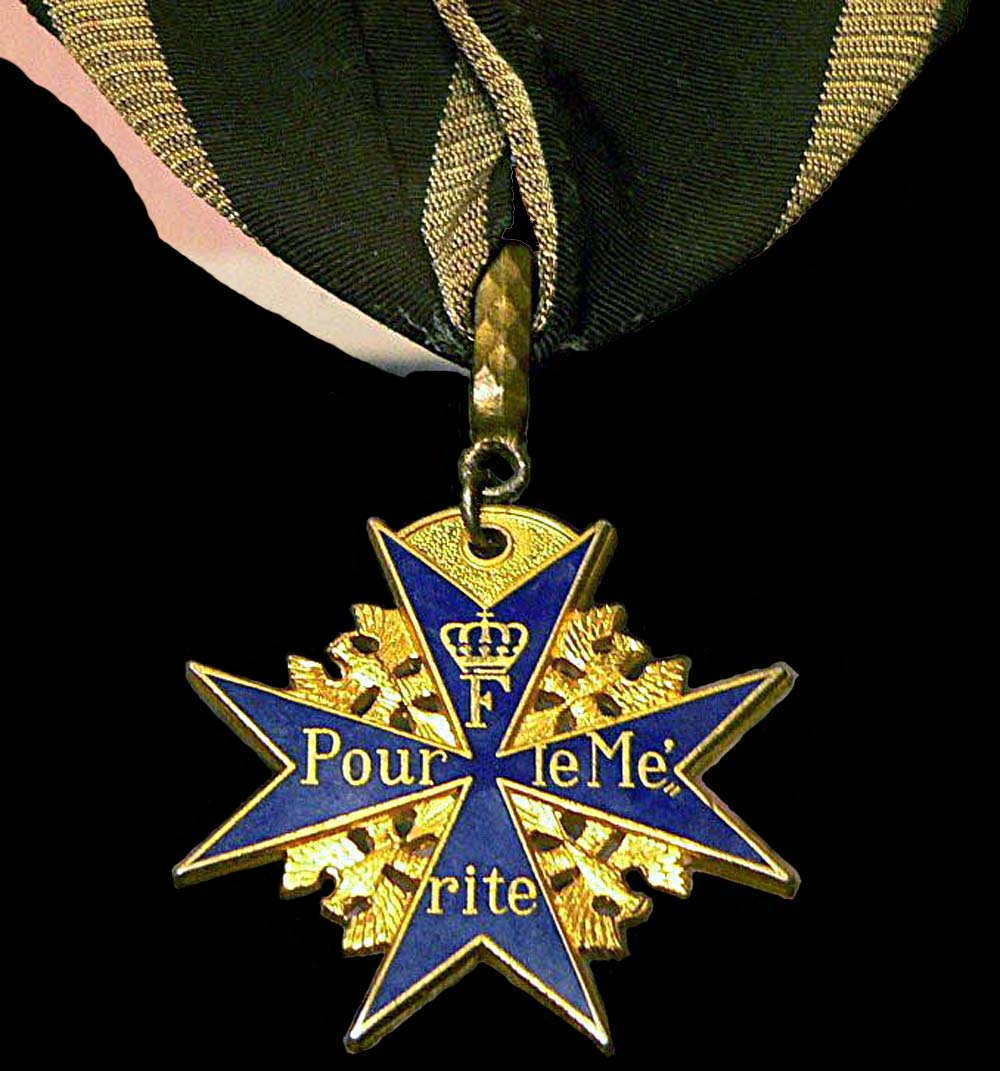
Pour le Mérite

The list contains recipients of the Pour le Mérite military class. Since the foundation, a total of 5,430 persons received this award. The Pour le Mérite was the Kingdom of Prussia's highest military order for officers until the end of World War I. Its equivalent for non-commissioned officers and enlisted men was the Military Merit Cross.

Note: Ranks should be those held at the times of the awarding.

== A ==
Name	Rank	Branch	Pour le Mérite	Oak Leaves	Image
Hans Adam	Kapitänleutnant	Navy	6 November 1917	—	
Armand von Alberti	Oberst	Württembergian Army	8 November 1918	—	
Viktor Albrecht	Generalleutnant	Army	9 April 1918	—	
Karl Allmenröder	Leutnant	Luftstreitkräfte	14 June 1917	—	
Dr. Ernst Freiherr von Althaus	Oberleutnant	Saxon Army; Luftstreitkräfte	21 July 1916	—	
Richard d' Alton-Rauch	Oberstleutnant	Army	15 August 1918	—	—
Achaz Heinrich von Alvensleben	Major	Army	1758	—	
Constantin von Alvensleben	Generalleutnant	Army	17 September 1866	31 December 1870	
Gustav von Alvensleben	General der Infanterie	Army	17 June 1871	—	
Walter Arens	Major	Army	25 October 1918	—	—
Lothar von Arnauld de la Perière	Kapitänleutnant	Navy	11 October 1916	—	
Achim von Arnim	Hauptmann	Army	17 April 1918	—	
Arthur Arz von Straussenburg	Feldmarschall-Leutnant; General der Infanterie	Austrian Army	28 August 1915	6 August 1917	
Kasimir von Auer	Stabsrittmeister	Army	18 December 1812	—	

== B ==
Name	Rank	Branch	Pour le Mérite	Oak Leaves	Image
Paul Baader	Major	Army	20 October 1918	—	—
Ernst von Bacmeister	General der Infanterie	Army	8 October 1917	—	
Prince Wilhelm of Baden	General der Infanterie	Baden Army	18 December 1895	—	
Paul Bäumer	Leutnant	Luftstreitkräfte	2 November 1918	—	
William Balck	Generalmajor	Army	9 March 1918	—	
Hermann von Balcke	Oberstleutnant	Army	29 July 1917	—	—
Viktor Bangert	Hauptmann	Army	24 November 1917	—	—
Carl Freiherr von Bardolff	Generalmajor	Austrian Army	27 July 1917	—	
Albert von Barnekow	Generalmajor; Generalleutnant	Army	20. September 1866	20. Januar 1871	
Karl Bartenbach	Korvettenkapitän	Navy	27 October 1917	—	
Josef Barth	Major	Army	9 August 1918	—	—
Max Bauer	Oberstleutnant	Army	19 December 1916	28 March 1918	
Prince Franz of Bavaria	Generalmajor	Bavarian Army	16 May 1918	—	
Prince Leopold of Bavaria	Generalfeldmarschall	Bavarian Army	5 August 1915	25 July 1917	
Ludwig III of Bavaria	Generalfeldmarschall	Bavarian Army	8 December 1916	—	
Rupprecht, Crown Prince of Bavaria	Generaloberst; Generalfeldmarschall	Bavarian Army	22 August 1915	20 December 1916	
Olivier Freiherr von Beaulieu-Marconnay	Leutnant	Luftstreitkräfte	26 October 1918	—	—
Friedrich Becker	Major	Army	17 September 1918	—	—
Friedrich Wilhelm Heinrich Ernst von Beeren	Major	Army	7 June 1864	—	—
Curt von Beerfelde	Major	Army	21 April 1918	—	—
Paul Behncke	Vizeadmiral	Navy	4 December 1917	—	
Franz von Behr	Oberstleutnant	Army	8 October 1917	—	—
Stanislaus Behrendt	Hauptmann	Army	4 October 1918	—	—
Eduard von Below	General der Infanterie	Army	18 August 1917	—	
Ernst von Below	Generalmajor	Army	24 November 1917	13 October 1918	
Fritz von Below	General der Infanterie	Army	16 February 1915	11 August 1916	
Hans von Below	Generalmajor	Army	24 November 1917	—	
Otto von Below	General der Infanterie	Army	16 February 1915	27 April 1917	
Theodor Werner Christian von Below	Oberst	Army	1 January 1815	—	—
Richard von Berendt	Oberst; Generalmajor	Army	14 January 1917	24 November 1917	—
Karl Berger	Generalmajor	Army	17 April 1918	—	—
Walter von Bergmann	Generalmajor	Army	8 May 1918	—	—
Waldemar Berka	Hauptmann	Army	23 June 1918	—	—
Fritz Otto Bernert	Leutnant	Luftstreitkräfte	23 April 1917	—	
Friedrich von Bernhardi	General der Kavallerie	Army	20 August 1916	15 May 1918	
Felix von Bernuth	Hauptmann	Army	9 October 1918	—	—
Hans Berr	Oberleutnant	Luftstreitkräfte	4 December 1916	—	
Albert von Berrer	Generalleutnant	Württembergian Army	27 August 1917	—	
Rudolf Berthold	Oberleutnant	Luftstreitkräfte	12 October 1916	—	
Hans Beseler	Major	Army	28 November 1917	—	—
Hans Hartwig von Beseler	General der Infanterie	Army	10 October 1914	20 August 1915	
Ernst von Bila	Major	Army	23 August 1918	—	
Karl Anton von Bila	Hauptmann	Army	13 Juli 1794	—	—
Rudolf Ernst von Bila	Stabsrittmeister	Army	18 September 1787	—	—
Karl Gustav von Bilow	Hauptmann	Army	2 June 1793	—	—
Jakob Albrecht von Birckhahn	Oberst	Army	27 August 1789	—	—
Siegmund Ernst von Birckhahn	Hauptmann	Army	June 1745	—	—
Josef Bischoff	Major	Army	30 June 1918	—	
Otto von Bismarck	General der Kavallerie	Army	—	1 September 1884	
Werner von Blomberg	Major	Army	3 June 1918	—	
Walter Blume	Leutnant	Luftstreitkräfte	30 September 1918	—	
Georg Ewald von Blumenthal	Stabskapitän	Army	May 1757	—	—
Leonhard Graf von Blumenthal	Oberst; Generalmajor	Army	22 April 1864	17 September 1866	
Hans Graf von Blumenthal	Oberstleutnant	Army	1745	—	—
Fedor von Bock	Major	Army	1 April 1918	—	
Franz-Karl von Bock	Major	Army	13 October 1918	—	—
Alfred von Böckmann	Generalleutnant	Heer	8 October 1916	1 June 1917	
Eduard von Böhm-Ermolli	Generaloberst; Feldmarschall	Austrian Army	7 October 1916	27 July 1918	
Erich Böhme	Oberstleutnant	Army	7 May 1918	—	
Erwin Böhme	Leutnant	Luftstreitkräfte	24 November 1917	—	
Karl Friedrich Wilhelm von Böhmer	Premierleutnant	Army	1807	—	—
Max von Boehn	General der Infanterie	Heer	24 August 1916	20 May 1917	
Oswald Boelcke	Hauptmann	Luftstreitkräfte	12 January 1916	—	
Oskar Freiherr von Boenigk	Oberleutnant	Luftstreitkräfte	25 October 1918	—	—
Friedrich Ritter von Bogendörfer	Oberstleutnant	Bavarian Army	8 November 1918	—	—
Helmuth Bohm	Major	Army	5 May 1918	—	—
Carl Bolle	Rittmeister	Luftstreitkräfte	28 August 1918	—	
Heinrich Bongartz	Leutnant	Luftstreitkräfte	23 December 1917	—	
Curt von dem Borne	Generalleutnant; General der Infanterie	Army	9 April 1918	3 November 1918	
Svetozar Boroëvić von Bojna	Generaloberst	Austrian Army	3 November 1917	—	
Karl von Borries	Generalleutnant	Army	13 June 1918	—	—
Rudolf von Borries	Generalmajor	Heer	4 August 1917	—	
Ludwig von Borstell	Sekondeleutnant; Generalmajor	Army	11 December 1793	21 October 1813	
Julius von Bose	General der Infanterie	Army	20 September 1866	—	
Kuno-Hans von Both	Hauptmann	Army	10 April 1918	—	
Felix Graf von Bothmer	General der Infanterie	Bavarian Army	7 July 1915	25 July 1917	
Ernst Brandenburg	Hauptmann	Luftstreitkräfte	14 June 1917	—	—
Curt von Brandenstein	Hauptmann	Army	26 September 1918	—	—
Hermann von Brandenstein	Oberstleutnant	Army	27 August 1918	—	—
Otto Freiherr von Brandenstein	Oberst	Army	15 May 1918	—	
Cordt Freiherr von Brandis	Major	Army	21 April 1918	—	—
Cordt von Brandis	Oberleutnant	Army	14 March 1916	—	—
Tido von Brederlow	Major	Army	9 October 1918	—	—
Antol Graf von Bredow	Generalleutnant	Army	23 July 1915	—	—
Ludwig Breßler	Generalmajor	Army	9 October 1918	—	—
Carl Briese	Generalleutnant	Army	30 August 1918	—	
Friedrich Brinckmann	Major	Army	6 March 1918	—	—
Heinrich Brinkord	Oberleutnant	Arny	21 October 1918	—	—
Ferdinand Brisken	Oberstleutnant	Army	23 April 1918	—	—
Bernhard Bronsart von Schellendorff	Oberst	Army	16 September 1916	—	—
Hans Bronsart von Schellendorff	Major	Army	25 October 1918	—	—
Walter Siegfried Bronsart von Schellendorff	Major	Army	2 June 1918	—	—
Georg Bruchmüller	Oberstleutnant	Army	1 May 1917	26 March 1918	
Erich Brückner	Major	Army	4 September 1918	—	—
Friedrich Bruns	Major	Army	6 November 1918	—	—
Julius Buckler	Oberstleutnant	Luftstreitkräfte	4 December 1917	—	
Franz Büchner	Leutnant	Saxon Army; Luftstreitkräfte	25 October 1918	—	
Hans-Joachim Buddecke	Oberleutnant	Luftstreitkräfte	14 April 1916	—	
Gustav Freiherr von Buddenbrock	Oberst; Generalleutnant	Army	7 June 1864	18 January 1871	
Christoph Karl von Bülow	Leutnant	Army	1745	—	—
Hans von Bülow	Generalmajor	Army	8 December 1871	—	
Karl Wilhelm Paul von Bülow	Generalfeldmarschall	Army	4 April 1915	—	
Walter von Bülow-Bothkamp	Leutnant	Luftstreitkräfte	8 October 1917	—	
Heinrich von Bünau	Major	Army	17 September 1918	—	—
Robert Bürkner	Oberstleutnant	Army	16 May 1918	—	—
Boris III of Bulgaria	Generalfeldmarschall	Bulgarian Army	26 October 1916	—	
Ferdinand I of Bulgaria	Generalfeldmarschall	Bulgarian Army	—	8 September 1916	
Hermann Ritter von Burkhardt	Generalleutnant	Bavarian Army	12 May 1917	—	—
Ernst Busch	Hauptmann	Army	4 October 1918	—	
Georg Freiherr von dem Bussche-Haddenhausen	Major	Saxon Army	18 September 1918	—	—
Johannes von Busse	Generalmajor	Army	16 April 1918	—	

== C ==
Name	Rank	Branch	Pour le Mérite	Oak Leaves	Image
Karl Ernst Wilhelm von Canitz und Dallwitz	Leutnant; Major	Army	18 July 1807	5 February 1815	
Philipp Carl von Canstein	Generalmajor; Generalleutnant	Army	7 June 1864	20 September 1866	
Eduard von Capelle	Admiral	Marine	9 January 1918	—	
Leo von Caprivi	Oberstleutnant	Army	18 January 1871	—	
Alois Caracciola-Delbrück	Major	Army	25 August 1918	—	—
Adolph von Carlowitz	General der Infanterie	Saxon Army	29 July 1917	25 May 1918	
Walter Caspari	Major	Army	21 April 1918	—	—
Martin Chales de Beaulieu	Generalleutnant	Army	5 September 1917	—	
Siegfried von la Chevallerie	Generalmajor; Generalleutnant	Army	20 January 1918	5 October 1918	—
Friedrich Christiansen	Oberleutnant zur See	Naval Aviation	11 December 1917	—	
Eberhard von Claer	General der Infanterie	Army	29 June 1915	—	
Max Clausius	Major	Army	15 October 1918	—	—
Erwin von Collani	Major	Army	7 May 1918	—	—
Alexander Commichau	Major	Army	21 April 1918	—	—
Franz Conrad von Hötzendorf	General der Infanterie; Feldmarschall	Austrian Army	12 May 1915	26 January 1917	
Richard von Conta	Generalleutnant	Army	15 October 1916	26 March 1918	
Wilhelm René de l'Homme de Courbière	Oberstleutnant	Army	July 1760	—	
Elimar von Cranach	Generalmajor	Army	22 April 1918	—	

== D ==
Name	Rank	Branch	Pour le Mérite	Oak Leaves	Image
Rudolf Dänner	Generalmajor	Bavarian Army	26 October 1918	—	—
Viktor Dallmer	Generalleutnant	Army	26 April 1917	8 June 1918	
Gustav Dammann	Major	Army	6 November 1918	—	—
Johannes von Dassel	Generalmajor	Army	25 October 1918	—	—
Carl Degelow	Leutnant	Luftstreitkräfte	9 November 1918	—	—
Berthold von Deimling	General der Infanterie	Army	28 August 1916	—	
Dr. Walter von Delius	Major	Army	20 January 1918	—	—
Friedrich-Wilhelm Dernen	Leutnant	Army	29 August 1918	—	
Arnold von Detten	Major	Army	27 August 1918	—	—
Curt von Dewitz	Major	Army	22 April 1918	—	—
Carl Dieffenbach	Generalleutnant	Army	26 April 1917	—	
Otto Freiherr von Diepenbroick-Grüter	Generalmajor	Army	13 June 1918	—	—
Wilhelm Arthur von Ditfurth	Major	Army	—	2 October 1815	
Wilhelm von Ditfurth	Major	Army	21 April 1918	—	—
Achmed Djemal-Pascha	Generalleutnant	Ottoman Army	4 September 1917	—	
Nikolaus Graf zu Dohna-Schlodien	Korvettenkapitän	Navy	7 March 1916	—	
Wilhelm von Dommes	Generalmajor	Army	8 June 1918	—	—
Georg Dorndorf	Oberstleutnant	Army	1 April 1918	—	—
Albert Dossenbach	Leutnant	Luftstreitkräfte	11 November 1916	—	—
Eduard Ritter von Dostler	Oberleutnant	Bavarian Army; Luftstreitkräfte	6 August 1917	—	
Hermann Drechsel	Oberstleutnant	Army	3 April 1918	—	—
Hermann von Dresler und Scharfenstein	Generalmajor	Army	8 November 1917	—	
Hans von Drigalski	Major	Army	28 March 1918	—	—
Wilhelm von Dücker	Oberstleutnant	Army	29 August 1918	—	—

== E ==
Name	Rank	Branch	Pour le Mérite	Oak Leaves	Image
Johannes von Eben	General der Infanterie	Army	7 October 1916	22 September 1917	
Magnus von Eberhardt	General der Infanterie	Army	20 May 1917	25 April 1918	
Gottfried Edelbüttel	Oberstleutnant	Army	12 October 1917	—	—
Franz Freiherr von Edelsheim	Oberstleutnant	Army	4 October 1918	—	—
Ralph von Egidy	Oberstleutnant	Saxon Army	31 October 1918	—	—
Oskar von Ehrenthal	General der Infanterie	Saxon Army	15 June 1917	—	—
Hermann von Eichhorn	Generaloberst	Herr	18 August 1915	28 September 1915	
Karl von Einem genannt von Rothmaler	Generaloberst	Heer	16 March 1915	17 October 1916	
Karl d'Elsa	General der Infanterie	Saxon Army	1 September 1916	—	
Hugo Elstermann von Elster	Generalleutnant	Army	22 September 1917	—	—
Otto von Emmich	General der Infanterie	Army	7 August 1914	14 May 1915	
Siegfried Freiherr von Ende	Generalleutnant	Army	31 October 1917	—	—
Nikolaus Ritter von Endres	Generalleutnant	Bavarian Army	17 April 1918	4 August 1918	—
Georg von Engelbrechten	Generalleutnant	Army	8 July 1918	—	
Gustaf Stanislaus von Engeström	Rittmeister	Swedish Army	December 1813	—	
Damad Enver-Pascha	Generalleutnant	Ottoman Army	23 August 1915	10 January 1916	
Franz von Epp	Oberst	Bavarian Army	29 May 1918	—	
Hans von der Esch	Generalmajor	Army	13 October 1918	—	—
Friedrich Freiherr von Esebeck	Oberstleutnant	Army	3 April 1918	—	—
Ludwig von Estorff	Generalleutnant	Army	6 September 1917	—	
Günther von Etzel	Generalmajor; Generalleutnant	Army	4 August 1917	25 October 1918	—
Siegfried Graf zu Eulenburg-Wicken	Major	Army	27 August 1917	4 September 1918	—

== F ==
Name	Rank	Branch	Pour le Mérite	Oak Leaves	Image
Max von Fabeck	General der Infanterie	Army	23 August 1915	—	
Alexander von Falkenhausen	Major	Army	7 May 1918	—	
Ludwig von Falkenhausen	Generaloberst	Army	23 August 1915	15 April 1916	
Erich von Falkenhayn	General der Infanterie	Army	16 February 1915	3 June 1915	
Eugen von Falkenhayn	General der Kavallerie	Army	28 August 1915	13 November 1915	—
Karl von Fasbender	General der Infanterie	Bavarian Army	13 September 1916	—	
Wilhelm Faupel	Oberstleutnant	Army	18 June 1918	August 1918	
Carlo Filangieri	Lieutenant General	Neapolitan Army	19 March 1850	—	
Bernhard Graf Finck von Finckenstein	Generalmajor	Army	9 April 1918	—	—
Kurt Fischer	Oberstleutnant	Army	4 November 1917	—	—
Udo von Fischer	Oberst	Army	30 June 1918	—	—
Paul Fleck	Generalleutnant	Army	16 March 1915	—	
Sigismund von Foerster	Major	Army	28 May 1901	—	—
Dr. Walther Forstmann	Kapitänleutnant	Navy	12 August 1916	—	—
Ernst Freiherr von Forstner	Oberstleutnant	Army	31 October 1917	17 June 1918	
Ernst Frahnert	Major	Army	14 November 1917	—	—
Hermann von François	General der Infanterie	Army	14 May 1915	27 July 1917	
Adolf Franke	General der Artillerie	Army	18 October 1918	—	
Hans-Heydan von Frankenberg und Ludwigsdorf	Major	Army	5 July 1918	—	—
Wilhelm Frankl	Leutnant	Luftstreitkräfte	12 August 1916	—	
Eduard von Fransecky	Generalleutnant; General der Infanterie	Army	20 September 1866	5 February 1871	
Rudolf Frantz	Major	Army	25 July 1917	—	—
Erich Freyer	Generalleutnant	Army	17 April 1918	—	—
Karl von Freyhold	Hauptmann	Army	14 June 1918	—	—
Hermann Fricke	Oberleutnant	Luftstreitkräfte	23 December 1917	—	—
Friedrich von Friedeburg	Generalleutnant	Army	20 September 1918	—	—
Karl Friederici	Major	Heer	30 June 1918	—	—
Albert von Fritsch	Generalleutnant	Württembergian Army	3 September 1918	—	—
Lothar Fritsch	Major	Army	6 May 1918	—	—
Georg Frotscher	Oberst	Saxon Army	5 May 1918	—	—
Georg Fuchs	Generalleutnant	Army	18 August 1917	—	
Friedrich Wilhelm von Funck	Major; Oberst	Army	18 October 1812	3 November 1815	—

== G ==
Name	Rank	Branch	Pour le Mérite	Oak Leaves	Image
Arthur von Gabain	Generalmajor	Army	8 November 1917	17 April 1918	
Otto Gabcke	Hauptmann	Army	1 September 1918	—	—
Hans Emil Alexander Gaede	General der Infanterie	Army	25 August 1915	—	
Erich Gaertner	Major	Army	8 November 1918	—	—
Max von Gallwitz	General der Artillerie	Army	24 July 1915	28 September 1915	
Otto von Garnier	Generalleutnant	Army	12 October 1916	—	
Georg Freiherr von Gayl	General der Infanterie	Army	8 May 1918	—	
Wilhelm von Gazen	Hauptmann	Army	24 November 1917	—	—
Ludwig Freiherr von Gebsattel	General der Kavallerie	Bavarian Army	4 October 1916	—	
Carl Siegfried Ritter von Georg	Kapitänleutnant	Navy	24 April 1918	—	
Ulrich von Germar	Major	Army	22 April 1918	—	—
Friedrich von Gerok	General der Infanterie	Württembergian Army	7 July 1915	—	
Daniel Gerth	Oberleutnant	Army	11 October 1918	—	
Adolf von Glümer	Generalleutnant	Army	5 February 1871	—	
Wilhelm Graf von Gluszewski-Kwilecki	Oberstleutnant	Army	24 November 1917	—	—
August Karl von Goeben	Generalmajor; Generalleutnant	Army	3 July 1864	20 September 1866	
Hermann Göring	Oberleutnant	Luftstreitkräfte	2 June 1918	—	
Wilhelm von Goerne	Oberstleutnant; Oberst	Army	20 May 1917	30 August 1918	—
Martin Goesch	Hauptmann	Army	21 April 1918	—	—
Georg von Götz	Major	Army	17 October 1918	—	—
August von Goetzen	Oberstleutnant	Army	11 September 1916	—	—
Rüdiger von der Goltz	Generalmajor	Army	15 May 1918	—	
Leopold Gondrecourt	Generalmajor	Austrian Army	18 August 1864	—	
Friedrich von Gontard	Generalleutnant	Army	9 April 1918	4 August 1918	
Heinrich Gontermann	Leutnant	Luftstreitkräfte	14 May 1917	—	
Konrad von Goßler	General der Infanterie	Army	10 August 1916	—	
Wolff von Graeffendorff	Hauptmann	Army	24 November 1917	—	
Wilhelm Edler von Graeve	Hauptmann	Army	8 November 1918	—	—
Kurt von Greiff	Major	Württembergian Army	9 June 1918	—	—
Robert Ritter von Greim	Oberleutnant	Luftstreitkräfte	8 October 1918	—	
Wilhelm Griebsch	Leutnant	Luftstreitkräfte	30 September 1918	—	—
Wilhelm von Groddeck	Generalmajor	Army	9 April 1918	—	—
Wilhelm Groener	Generalmajor	Württembergian Army	11 September 1915	—	
Hans von Gronau	General der Artillerie	Army	4 October 1916	6 August 1918	
Jürgen von Grone	Oberleutnant	Luftstreitkräfte	13 October 1918	—	—
Theodor Groppe	Hauptmann	Army	6 November 1918	—	—
Hans von Grothe	Oberstleutnant	Army	2 November 1918	—	—
Paul Grünert	Generalleutnant	Army	3 May 1918	—	—
Ernst Gruson	Major	Army	6 July 1918	—	—
Erich Gudowius	Major	Army	4 August 1918	—	—
Erich von Gündell	General der Infanterie	Army	28 August 1916	—	
Hans von Guretzky-Cornitz	General der Infanterie	Army	9 March 1916	—	—

== H ==
Name	Rank	Branch	Pour le Mérite	Oak Leaves	Image
Friedrich Ritter von Haack	Oberstleutnant	Bavarian Army	8 August 1918	—	—
Wilhelm von Haasy	Oberst	Bavarian Army	10 June 1918	—	
Hans Christoph Friedrich Graf von Hacke	Oberst	Army	June 1740	—	
Heinrich Freiherr von Hadeln	Major	Army	26 August 1917	—	—
Siegfried Haenicke	Hauptmann	Army	14 June 1918	—	—
Gottlieb von Haeseler	Major; Generalfeldmarschall	Army	19 January 1873	22 March 1915	
Wilhelm Hagedorn	Major	Army	30 July 1917	—	—
Karl von Hagen	Major	Army	8 April 1918	—	—
Dr. Oskar von Hahnke	Oberstleutnant	Army	8 October 1918	—	—
Karl Georg Albrecht Ernst von Hake	Sekondeleutnant; Generalmajor	Army	17 September 1793	3 April 1814	
Ernst Hammacher	Major	Army	31 October 1918	—	—
Rudolph Hammer	Generalmajor	Saxon Army	24 November 1917	—	—
Fritjof Freiherr von Hammerstein-Gesmold	Oberstleutnant	Army	1 November 1918	—	—
Hans Freiherr von Hammerstein-Gesmold	Generalmajor	Army	6 November 1918	—	—
Karl Hansen	Hauptmann	Army	8 November 1918	—	—
Georg von Harder	Major	Army	25 August 1918	—	—
Gottfried Ludwig Matthias von Hartmann	Oberstleutnant	Prussian Army	September 1792	—	
Jakob von Hartmann	General der Infantrie	Bavarian Army	1 March 1872	—	
Kurt Hartwig	Kapitänleutnant	Navy	3 October 1918	—	—
Otto Hasse	Oberstleutnant	Army	23 December 1917	12 May 1918	
Hans-Joachim Haupt	Hauptmann	Army	16 March 1916	—	
Wilhelm Haupt	Major	Army	18 August 1918	—	—
Ludwig Hauß	Oberstleutnant	Army	11 September 1918	—	—
Walter von Haxthausen	Generalmajor	Army	13 June 1918	—	—
Josias von Heeringen	Generaloberst	Army	25 August 1915	25 August 1916	
Heino von Heimburg	Oberleutnant zur See	Navy	11 August 1917	—	
Oskar Heinicke	Korvettenkapitän	Navy	5 March 1918	—	—
Franz Heinrigs	Major	Army	8 November 1917	—	—
Siegfried von Held	Generalmajor	Army	7 November 1918	—	—
Emil Hell	Oberst	Army	21 September 1916	11 January 1917	
Hans Ritter von Hemmer	Oberstleutnant	Bavarian Army	25 July 1917	—	—
Richard Hentsch	Oberst	Saxon Army	23 September 1917	—	
Ferdinand Herold	Major	Army	8 October 1917	—	—
Adolf Herrgott	Oberst	Bavarian Army	4 August 1918	—	—
Otto Hersing	Kapitänleutnant	Navy	5 June 1915	—	
Friedrich Wilhelm von Hetzberg	General der Kavallerie	Army	4 November 1918	—	—
Hans Hesse	Oberst	Army	11 December 1916	—	—
Prince Louis of Hesse	Generalleutnant	Army	18 February 1871	—	
Albert Heuck	Major	Army	28 October 1918	—	
Wilhelm Heye	Oberst	Army	20 August 1916	3 April 1918	
Hubert Heym	Major	Army	9 April 1918	—	—
Hans von Heynitz	Oberst	Army	3 December 1917	—	—
Robert Hieronymus	Leutnant	Army	23 June 1918	—	—
Paul von Hindenburg	Generaloberst; Generalfeldmarschall	Army	8 September 1914	23 February 1915	
Franz von Hipper	Vizeadmiral	Navy	5 June 1916	—	
Karl Friedrich Bernhard Hellmuth von Hobe	Generalmajor	Army	—	31 May 1814	—
Karl Hoefer	Oberst; Generalmajor	Army	23 July 1916	14 April 1918	
Walter Höhndorf	Leutnant	Luftstreitkräfte	20 July 1916	—	
Ernst von Hoeppner	Generalleutnant	Luftstreitkräfte	8 April 1917	—	
Eberhard von Hofacker	Generalleutnant	Württembergian Army	26 April 1917	24 November 1917	
Max Hoffmann	Oberst	Army	7 October 1916	25 July 1917	
Heinrich von Hofmann	Generalmajor; Generalleutnant	Army	12 November 1917	18 September 1918	—
Max Hofmann	Generalleutnant; General der Infanterie	Army	28 August 1915	5 July 1918	—
Ernst von Hohnhorst	Oberstleutnant	Army	6 May 1918	—	—
Henning von Holtzendorff	Admiral	Navy	22 March 1917	1 February 1918	
Erich Homburg	Oberleutnant	Luftstreitkräfte	13 October 1918	—	—
Hans-Georg Horn	Oberleutnant	Luftstreitkräfte	23 December 1917	—	—
Heinrich Wilhelm von Horn	Premierleutnant; Generalmajor	Army	6 June 1794	8 December 1813	
Rudolf von Horn	Generalmajor	Army	21 September 1918	—	—
Hans Howaldt	Oberleutnant zur See	Navy	26 December 1917	—	
Otto Freiherr von Hügel	General der Infanterie	Württembergian Army	28 August 1916	—	
Walter von Hülsen	Generalleutnant	Army	9 April 1918	—	—
Wilhelm Humser	Major	Army	16 May 1918	—	—
Paul Hundius	Kapitänleutnant	Navy	18 August 1918	—	—
Wilhelm Hundrich	Oberst	Army	23 April 1918	—	—
Friedrich Franz von Huth	Oberstleutnant	Army	31 January 1918	—	
Oskar von Hutier	General der Infanterie	Heer	6 September 1917	23 March 1918	

== I ==
Name	Rank	Branch	Pour le Mérite	Oak Leaves	Image
Emil Ilse	Generalleutmant	Army	28 August 1916	—	—
Max Immelmann	Leutnant	Saxon Army; Luftstreitkräfte	12 January 1916	—	

== J ==
Name	Rank	Branch	Pour le Mérite	Oak Leaves	Image
Albano von Jacobi	General der Infanterie	Army	12 April 1917	—	—
Josef Jacobs	Leutnant	Luftstreitkräfte	18 July 1918	—	
Friedrich Wilhelm von Jagow	Generalmajor	Army	—	2 October 1815	
Georg Johow	Oberst	Army	21 September 1916	—	—
Edgar Josenhanß	Oberleutnant	Württembergian Army; Luftstreitkräfte	28 October 1918	—	—
Ernst Jünger	Leutnant	Army	18 September 1918	—	
Andreas Franz von Jutrzenka	Fähnrich	Army	28 November 1793	—	—

== K ==
Name	Rank	Branch	Pour le Mérite	Oak Leaves	Image
Ernst Kabisch	Generalmajor	Army	9 October 1918	—	—
Ernst Kaether	Oberstleutnant	Army	8 November 1918	—	—
Hans-Heinrich von Kahlden	Major	Army	6 November 1918	—	—
Konrad Kalau vom Hofe	Hauptmann	Army	23 July 1916	—	
Georg von Kameke	Generalmajor; Generalleutnant	Army	20 September 1866	2 January 1871	
Hugo von Kathen	General der Infanterie	Army	28 August 1916	27 August 1917	
Georg Kaulbach	Oberst	Army	2 June 1918	—	—
Wilhelm Kaupert	Generalmajor	Army	29 October 1918	—	—
Karl von Keiser	Major	Army	24 November 1917	—	—
Richard von Keiser	Oberstleutnant	Army	21 April 1918	—	—
Alfred Keller	Hauptmann	Luftstreitkräfte	4 December 1917	—	
Viktor Keller	Oberstleutnant	Army	27 March 1918	—	—
Erich Kewisch	Major	Army	4 August 1918	—	—
Christoph Ritter von Kiefhaber	Generalleutnant	Bavarian Army	24 November 1917	—	—
Paul Kienitz	Oberstleutnant	Army	16 July 1918	—	—
Karl von Kietzell	Major	Army	5 July 1918	—	—
Günther Graf von Kirchbach	Generaloberst	Army	27 October 1917	—	
Hans von Kirchbach	General der Artillerie	Saxon Army	11 August 1916	—	
Hugo von Kirchbach	Generalleutnant; General der Infanterie	Army	20 September 1866	18 February 1871	
Heinrich Kirchheim	Hauptmann	Army	13 October 1918	—	
Hans Kirschstein	Leutnant	Luftstreitkräfte	24 June 1918	—	—
Otto Kissenberth	Oberleutnant	Bavarian Army; Luftstreitkräfte	30 June 1918	—	
Hans Klein	Leutnant	Luftstreitkräfte	4 December 1917	—	—
Rudolf Kleine	Hauptmann	Luftstreitkräfte	4 October 1917	—	
Alfred von Kleist	Generalleutnant	Army	8 October 1918	—	—
Paul Klette	Major	Army	21 April 1918	—	—
Willi von Klewitz	Oberstleutnant	Army	6 August 1917	26 August 1918	—
Hans Kloebe	Major	Army	20 January 1918	—	
Alexander von Kluck	Generaloberst	Army	28 March 1915	—	
Robert von Klüber	Major	Army	14 June 1917	—	—
Kurt von Klüfer	Major	Army	21 April 1918	—	—
Karl Friedrich von dem Knesebeck	Major; Generalmajor	Army	8 April 1807	19 October 1813	
Paul Ritter von Kneußl	Generalleutnant	Bavarian Army	3 June 1915	11 January 1917	
Maximilian von Knoch	Major	Army	15 August 1918	—	—
Otto Koch	Major	Army	21 April 1918	—	—
Hermann Köhl	Hauptmann	Württembergian Army; Luftstreitkräfte	21 May 1918	—	
Armin Koenemann	Generalmajor	Army	28 November 1917	—	—
Götz Freiherr von König	General der Kavallerie	Army	23 July 1915	—	—
Otto Könnecke	Leutnant	Luftstreitkräfte	26 September 1918	—	—
Hermann Baron Kövess von Kövesshaza	General der Infanterie; Feldmarschall	Austrian Army	4 December 1915	26 March 1918	
Waldemar Kophamel	Korvettenkapitän	Navy	29 December 1917	—	—
Robert Kosch	Generalleutnant	Army	20 February 1915	27 November 1915	
Konrad Kraehe	Oberstleutnant; Oberst	Army	8 October 1917	15 August 1918	—
Konrad Krafft von Dellmensingen	Generalleutnant	Bavarian Army	7 September 1916	11 December 1916	
Georg von Kranold	Major	Army	1 September 1918	—	—
Paul Krause	Oberst	Army	1 April 1918	—	—
Alfred Krauss	General der Infanterie	Austrian Army	12 November 1917	—	
Erich Krebs	Major	Army	23 December 1917	—	—
Fritz Theodor Kremkow	Hauptmann	Army	27 November 1900	—	—
Friedrich Freiherr Kress von Kressenstein	Oberst	Bavarian Army	4 September 1917	—	
Ernst-Karl von Kretschmann	Major	Army	8 June 1918	—	—
Eduard Kreuter	Generalmajor	Army	14 October 1918	—	—
Friedrich von Kriegsheim	Major	Army	28 March 1918	—	—
Heinrich Kroll	Leutnant	Luftstreitkräfte	29 March 1918	—	
Hans Krug von Nidda	General der Kavallerie	Saxon Army	7 October 1918	—	—
Boleslaus von Kuczkowski	Major	Army	24 November 1917	—	—
Kurt Kühme	Hauptmann	Army	30 August 1918	—	—
Viktor Kühne	Generalleutnant	Army	11 December 1916	—	
Dr. Hermann von Kuhl	Generalleutnant	Army	28 August 1916	20 December 1916	
Ferdinand von Kummer	Generalmajor; Generalleutnant	Army	20 September 1866	12 January 1871	
Friedrich Kundt	Generalmajor	Army	12 October 1918	—	—

== L ==
Name	Rank	Branch	Pour le Mérite	Oak Leaves	Image
Maximilian von Laffert	General der Kavallerie	Saxon Army	1 September 1916	—	
Otto Lancelle	Hauptmann	Army	9 October 1918	—	—
Rudolf Lange	Major	Army	21 July 1918	—	—
Felix Langer	Generalmajor; Generalleutnant	Army	8 October 1917	7 November 1918	—
Julius von Langsdorff	Major	Army	22 April 1918	—	—
Wilhelm von Lans	Korvettenkapitän	Navy	25 June 1900	—	—
Alfred von Larisch	General der Infanterie	Army	25 August 1918	—	
Arthur Laumann	Leutnant	Luftstreitkräfte	25 October 1918	—	—
Leopold Freiherr von Ledebur	Oberst	Army	29 August 1918	—	—
Gustav Leffers	Leutnant	Luftstreitkräfte	5 November 1916	—	—
Hermann Ritter von Lenz	Oberstleutnant	Bavarian Army	10 April 1918	—	—
Leo Leonhardy	Hauptmann	Luftstreitkräfte	2 October 1918	—	—
Arnold Lequis	Generalmajor	Army	11 October 1917	5 December 1917	
Paul von Lettow-Vorbeck	Oberst	Army; Schutztruppe	4 November 1916	10 October 1917	
Magnus von Levetzow	Kapitän zur See	Navy	31 October 1917	—	
Karl von Lewinski	Generalmajor	Army	2 May 1915	—	—
Eduard von Liebert	General der Infanterie	Army	6 June 1917	—	
Hermann von der Lieth-Thomsen	Oberstleutnant	Luftstreitkräfte	8 April 1917	—	—
Otto Liman von Sanders	General der Kavallerie	Army	23 August 1915	10 January 1916	
Wilhelm Lincke	Major	Army	12 May 1917	—	
Otto von der Linde	Leutnant	Army	18 September 1914	—	
Arthur von Lindequist	Generalleutnant	Army	23 December 1917	7 November 1918	—
Alexander von Linsingen	General der Infanterie	Army	14 May 1915	3 July 1915	
Karl Litzmann	Generalleutnant; General der Infanterie	Army	29 November 1914	18 August 1915	
Ewald von Lochow	General der Infanterie	Army	14 January 1915	13 November 1915	
Robert Loeb	Generalleutnant	Army	17 June 1918	—	—
Gerhard von Löbbecke	Major	Army	7 September 1918	—	—
Eckhard von Loeben	Oberstleutnant	Army	30 September 1918	—	—
Bruno Loerzer	Oberleutnant	Luftstreitkräfte	12 February 1918	—	
Erich Löwenhardt	Leutnant	Luftstreitkräfte	31 May 1918	—	
Johannes Lohs	Oberleutnant zur See	Navy	24 April 1918	—	—
Friedrich Karl von Loßberg	Oberst	Army	21 September 1916	24 April 1917	
Friedrich von Luck und Witten	Oberst	Army	29 August 1918	—	—
Erich Ludendorff	Generalmajor; Generalleutnant	Army	8 August 1914	23 February 1915	
Max Ludwig	Oberstleutnant	Army	5 July 1918	—	
Rudolf Lüters	Hauptmann	Army	30 September 1918	—	—
Arthur Freiherr von Lüttwitz	Generalmajor	Army	8 November 1917	—	
Walther von Lüttwitz	Generalleutnant	Army	24 August 1916	26 March 1918	
Ludwig Adolf Wilhelm von Lützow	Leutnant; Oberstleutnant	Army	21 April 1807	2 October 1815	
Kurt Freiherr von Lupin	Oberstleutnant	Württembergian Army	26 March 1918	—	—
Moriz von Lyncker	General der Infanterie	Army	2 November 1917	—	

== M ==
Name	Rank	Branch	Pour le Mérite	Oak Leaves	Image
August von Mackensen	General der Kavallerie; Generaloberst	Army	27 November 1914	14 June 1915	
Georg Maercker	Generalmajor	Army	1 October 1917	3 May 1918	
Franz Graf von Magnis	Oberstleutnant	Army	4 September 1918	—	—
Joseph Maximilian von Maillinger	Generalleutnant	Bavarian Army	19 January 1873	—	
Albrecht Gustav von Manstein	Generalleutnant	Army	20 September 1866	—	
Edwin von Manteuffel	Generalleutnant; General der Kavallerie	Army	7 August 1866	24 December 1870	
Heinrich von Manteuffel	Major	Army	21 June 1742	—	
Hans Markmann	Leutnant	Army	12 February 1918	—	—
Gottfried Marquard	Oberst	Army	27 September 1916	—	—
Wilhelm Marschall	Kapitänleutnant	Navy	4 July 1918	—	
Wolfgang von Marschall Freiherr von Altengottern	General der Kavallerie	Army	21 September 1916	16 May 1918	
Georg von der Marwitz	General der Kavallerie	Army	7 March 1915	14 May 1915	—
Robert Mattiaß	Major	Army	4 August 1918	—	—
Willi Matthias	Generalmajor	Army	22 November 1917	—	—
Dr. Heinrich von Maur	Generalmajor	Württembergian Army	20 May 1917	—	
Wilhelm Meckel	Generalmajor	Army	26 August 1917	—	—
Duke William of Mecklenburg-Schwerin	Generalmajor	Army	17 September 1866	—	
Johann Meister	Major	Saxon Army; Schutztruppe	2 November 1905	—	—
Hans-Joachim von Mellenthin	Kapitänleutnant	Navy	25 February 1918	—	—
Albert von Memerty	Generalmajor	Army	28 February 1871	—	
Carl Menckhoff	Leutnant	Luftstreitkräfte	23 April 1918	—	
Carl Merkel	Oberstleutnant	Army	3 May 1918	—	—
Max von Mertens	Hauptmann	Army	11 September 1918	—	—
Hermann Ritter Mertz von Quirnheim	Oberstleutnant	Bavarianian Army	28 March 1918	—	
Horst von Metzsch	Oberstleutnant	Saxon Army	7 October 1918	—	—
Emil Berthold Meyer	Hauptmann	Army	8 November 1918	—	—
Friedrich von Miaskowski	Major	Army	21 April 1918	—	—
Andreas Michelsen	Kapitän zur See	Navy	31 May 1918	—	—
Leopold Milisch	Major	Army	25 October 1918	—	—
Arnold Ritter von Möhl	Generalmajor	Bavarian Army	9 October 1918	—	—
Richard Moeller	Major	Army	20 May 1917	—	—
Karl Friedrich von Moller	Major	Army	2 October 1756	—	—
Helmuth von Moltke the Elder	Kapitain; General der Infanterie	Army	29 November 1839	17 February 1871	
Helmuth von Moltke the Younger	Generaloberst	Army	7 August 1915	—	
Dr. Robert Morath	Kapitänleutnant	Navy	7 November 1917	—	
Kurt von Morgen	Generalleutnant	Army	1 December 1914	11 December 1916	
Engelbert von Morsbach	Major	Army	5 July 1918	—	—
Otto von Moser	Generalleutnant	Wüttembergian Army	26 April 1917	—	
Axel Otto Mörner	Colonel	Swedish Army	11 February 1814	—	
Bruno von Mudra	General der Infanterie	Army	13 January 1915	17 October 1916	
Georg Mühry	Generalmajor	Arny	25 October 1918	—	—
Ferdinand Müller	Major	Army	15 August 1918	—	—
Georg Alexander von Müller	Admiral	Navy	24 March 1918	—	
Karl von Müller	Kapitän zur See	Navy	19 March 1918	—	
Max Ritter von Müller	Leutnant	Bavarian Army; Luftstreitkräfte	3 September 1917	—	
Otto Müller	Major	Army	17 September 1918	—	—
Rudolf Müller	Major	Army	15 August 1918	—	—
Albert Müller-Kahle	Oberleutnant	Luftstreitkräfte	13 October 1918	—	—
Max Ritter von Mulzer	Leutnant	Bavarian Army; Luftstreitkräfte	8 July 1916	—	
Albert von Mutius	Generalleutnant	Army	4 September 1918	—	—
Hugo Eberhard zu Münster-Meinhövel	Generalleutnant	Army	20 September 1866		

== N ==
Name	Rank	Branch	Pour le Mérite	Oak Leaves	Image
Ulrich Neckel	Leutnant	Luftstreitkräfte	8 November 1918	—	—
Carl Nehbel	Generalmajor	Army	30 September 1918	—	—
Karl August Nerger	Fregattenkapitän	Navy	24 February 1918	—	
Friedrich Nielebock	Leutnant	Army	2 June 1918	—	—
Maresuke Nogi	General	Japanese Army	10 January 1905	—	

== O ==
Name	Rank	Branch	Pour le Mérite	Oak Leaves	Image
Hugo von Obernitz	Oberst	Army	13 September 1866	—	
Curt von Oesterreich	Hauptmann	Army	5 June 1918	—	—
Archduke Eugen of Austria	Generaloberst; Feldmarschall	Austrian Army	23 May 1916	3 November 1917	
Franz Joseph I of Austria	Feldmarschall	Austrian Army	27 August 1914	27 August 1914	
Archduke Friedrich, Duke of Teschen	Feldmarschall	Austrian Army	12 May 1915	4 January 1917	
Archduke Joseph August of Austria	Generaloberst; Feldmarschall	Austrian Army	30 March 1917	26 March 1918	
Charles I of Austria	Feldmarschall	Austrian Army	20 May 1916	6 December 1916	
Horst Ritter und Edler von Oetinger	Generalleutnant	Army	26 March 1918	—	—
Erich Freiherr von Oldershausen	Oberst	Saxon Army	23 December 1917	26 March 1918	—
Martin Freiherr von Oldershausen	Oberst	Saxon Army	20 May 1917	—	—
Gustav von Oppen	Oberst	Army	1 November 1918	—	
Wilhelm Osiander	Major	Army	6 November 1918	—	—
Theodor Osterkamp	Leutnant	Luftstreitkräfte	2 September 1918	—	
Martin Otto	Major	Army	15 August 1918	—	—
Adolf von Oven	General der Infanterie	Army	22 September 1918	—	—
Ernst von Oven	Generalleutnant	Army	25 October 1918	—	
Georg von Oven	Oberstleutnant	Army	12 October 1917	—	—

== P ==
Name	Rank	Branch	Pour le Mérite	Oak Leaves	Image
Leo von Paczynski-Tenczin	Oberst	Army	25 November 1917	—	—
Günther von Pannewitz	General der Infanterie	Army	13 September 1916	—	
Alexander August Wilhelm von Pape	Oberst; Generalleutnant	Army	17 September 1866	22 March 1872	
Otto Parschau	Leutnant	Luftstreitkräfte	10 July 1916	—	
Karl Paulus	Oberst	Bavarian Army	13 October 1918	—	—
Richard von Pawelfz	Oberstleutnant	Army	23 December 1917	—	
Paul Freiherr von Pechmann	Oberleutnant	Luftstreitkräfte	31 July 1917	—	—
Peter von Pennavaire	Oberst	Army	June 1747	—	—
Axel von Petersdorff	Generalmajor	Army	22 April 1918	—	—
Hans Petri	Major	Army	28 October 1918	—	—
Wilhelm Pfaehler	Major	Army	9 October 1918	—	—
Clemens Pfafferott	Major	Army	30 October 1918	—	—
Georg Friedrich Wilhelm von Pfeilitzer gen. Franck	Leutnant	Army	October/November 1787	—	—
Benno Pflugradt	Major	Army	3 November 1918	—	—
Ernst von Pfuel	Oberst; Generalmajor	Army	28 December 1814	31 December 1831	
Ernst Ludwig von Pfuel	Major	Army	1760	—	—
Franz Wilhelm von Pfuel	Generalmajor	Heer		—	—
Karl Ludwig von Pfuel	Major	Army	1793	—	
Arthur Pikardi	Major	Army	6 July 1918	—	—
Friedrich von Pirscher	Major	Army	5 May 1918	—	
Horst Edler von der Planitz	General der Infanterie	Bavarian Army	20 May 1917	—	—
Axel von Platen	Major	Army	21 April 1918	—	—
Otto Plath	Hauptmann	Army	27 August 1918	—	—
Karl von Plehwe	Major	Army	21 April 1918	—	—
Hans von Plessen	Generaloberst	Army	24 March 1918	—	
Karl von Plettenberg	General der Infanterie	Army	14 May 1915	September 1915	
Otto von Plüskow	General der Infanterie	Army	11 May 1917	—	
Theophil von Podbielski	Generalmajor; Generalleutnant	Army	18 September 1866	5 March 1871	
Georg Pohlmann	Generalmajor	Army	4 October 1918	—	—
Rudolph Popelka	Oberst	Austrian Army	11 October 1918	—	—
Karl Ritter von Prager	Major	Bavarian Army	23 December 1917	—	—
Ludwig Freiherr von Preuschen von und zu Liebenstein	Hauptmann	Army	17 June 1918	—	—
Hans Preusker	Oberstleutnant	Army	27 July 1917	—	—
Prince Albert of Prussia	General der Kavallerie	Army	31 July 1866	31 December 1870	
Prince Albert of Prussia	Generalmajor; Generalleutnant	Army	19 September 1866	10 March 1871	
Prince Eitel Friedrich of Prussia	Oberst	Army	22 March 1915	14 May 1915	
Prince Friedrich Karl of Prussia	Hauptmann; General der Kavallerie	Army	16 September 1848	27 February 1864	
Prince Heinrich of Prussia	Großadmiral	Navy	1 August 1916	24 January 1918	
Frederick William, German Crown Prince	General der Infanterie; Generalfeldmarschall	Army	29 June 1866	3 August 1866; 2 September 1873	
William, German Crown Prince	Generalleutnant	Army	22 August 1915	8 September 1916	
William I of Prussia, German Emperor	General der Infanterie; Generaloberst	Army	27 July 1849	4 August 1866	
William II of Prussia, German Emperor	Generalfeldmarschall	Army	15 February 1915	12 May 1915	
Wilhelm Preusser	Hauptmann	Army	6 July 1918	—	—
Kurt Freiherr von Buchau	Generalmajor	Army	11 May 1918	—	—
Joachim Bernhard von Prittwitz	Leutnant	Army	25 August 1758	—	
Kurt von Pritzelwitz	General der Infanterie	Army	12 January 1916	—	
Fritz Pütter	Leutnant	Luftstreitkräfte	31 May 1918	—	
Wilhelm von Puttkamer	Generalleutnant	Army	26 October 1918	—	—

== Q ==
Name	Rank	Branch	Pour le Mérite	Oak Leaves	Image
Ferdinand von Quast	General der Infanterie	Army	11 August 1916	10 April 1918	
Kurt Moritz von Quednow	Major	Army	30 August 1918	—	—

== R ==
Name	Rank	Branch	Pour le Mérite	Oak Leaves	Image
Kurt Rackow	Leutnant	Army	7 June 1916	—	
Franz de Rainville	Major	Army	6 November 1918	—	—
Gustav von Rauch	Major; Generalmajor	Army	1 June 1807	3 June 1814	
Otto Ritter von Rauchenberger	Generalleutnant	Bavarian Army	6 September 1917	19 October 1918	
Johann von Ravenstein	Hauptmann	Army	23 June 1918	—	
Armin Reichenbach	Hauptmann	Army	21 April 1918	—	—
Wilhelm Reinhard	Oberstleutnant; Oberst	Army	27 August 1917	1 October 1918	—
Walther Reinhardt	Obestleutnant; Oberst	Württembergian Army	30 April 1917	3 June 1918	
Hermann Reinicke	Oberstleutnant	Army	8 December 1917	—	—
Maximilian Freiherr von Reitzenstein	Oberst	Army	8 November 1918	—	—
Theodor Renner	Generalmajor	Army	1 September 1918	—	—
Karl von Rettberg	Major	Army	24 November 1917	—	
Wilhelm Ribbentrop	Generalmajor	Army	18 September 1918	—	—
Lothar von Richthofen	Leutnant	Luftstreitkräfte	14 May 1917	—	
Manfred von Richthofen	Leutnant	Luftstreitkräfte	12 January 1917	—	
Manfred Freiherr von Richthofen	General der Kavallerie	Army	18 January 1918	—	—
Julius Riemann	General der Infanterie	Army	16 March 1915	—	
Peter Rieper	Leutnant	Army	7 July 1918	—	—
Hans Eberhard von Riesenthal	Oberstleutnant	Army	22 April 1918	—	—
Siegfried Rodig	Oberst	Army	21 April 1918	—	—
Dietrich von Roeder	Generalmajor	Army	17 April 1918	—	—
Carol I of Romania	—	—	18 December 1877	—	
Friedrich Ritter von Röth	Oberleutnant	Bavarian Army; Luftstreitkräfte	8 September 1918	—	—
Erwin Rommel	Oberleutnant	Württembergian Army	10 December 1917	—	
Albrecht von Roon	Generalfeldmarschall	Army		—	
Berend Roosen	Major	Army	9 April 1918	—	
Hans Rose	Kapitänleutnant	Navy	20 December 1917	—	
Hugo von Rosenberg	Fregattenkapitän	Navy	4 December 1917	—	—
Albrecht Freiherr von Rotberg	Major	Army	30 June 1918	—	—
Moritz Rothenbücher	Oberstleutnant	Army	15 August 1918	—	—
Karl Rothenburg	Leutnant	Army	30 June 1918	—	
Hermann Rudolph	Oberstleutnant	Army	25 October 1918	—	—
Otto Ruhnau	Major	Army	22 April 1918	—	—
Fritz Rümmelein	Leutnant	Army	28 October 1918	—	—
Fritz Rumey	Leutnant	Luftstreitkräfte	10 July 1918	—	
Siegfried Runge	Hauptmann	Army	30 August 1918	—	—
Rudolf Rusche	Generalleutnant	Army	4 November 1918	—	—

== S ==
Name	Rank	Branch	Pour le Mérite	Oak Leaves	Image
Karl Gustav von Sandrart	Generalmajor	Army	16 February 1871	—	—
Gerhard von Scharnhorst	Generalleutnant	Army	9 February 1807	—	
Ernst II, Duke of Saxe-Altenburg	General der Infanterie	Saxon Army	30 May 1915	—	
Frederick Augustus III of Saxony	Generalfeldmarschall	Saxon Army	29 December 1916	—	
Prince George of Saxony	Generalleutnant; Generalfeldmarschall	Saxon Army	6 December 1870	8 March 1896	
Gotthard Sachsenberg	Oberleutnant zur See	Naval Aviation	5 August 1918	—	
Sieghard von Saldern	Hauptmann	Army	21 May 1918	—	—
Reinhold Saltzwedel	Oberleutnant	Navy	20 August 1917	—	
Philipp Sander	Major	Army	6 May 1918	—	—
Traugott von Sauberzweig	Generalmajor	Army	6 September 1917	23 March 1918	
Ernst Schaumburg	Hauptmann	Army	21 April 1918	—	—
Karl-Emil Schäfer	Leutnant	Luftstreitkräfte	26 April 1917	—	
Reinhard Scheer	Admiral	Navy	5 June 1916	1 February 1918	
Reinhard von Scheffer-Boyadel	General der Infanterie	Army	2 December 1914	—	
Friedrich von Schele	Oberst	Army; Schutztruppe	20 November 1894	—	
Felix Schelle	Major	Army	30 June 1918	—	
Dedo von Schenck	General der Infanterie	Army	2 October 1916	—	
Werner Schering	Major	Army	3 September 1918	—	—
Heinrich Scheuch	Generalmajor	Army	8 April 1918	—	
Peter Scheunemann	Oberstleutnant	Army	1 April 1918	—	—
Ernst Adolph Alphons Freiherr von Schimmelmann	Major	Army	16 July 1918	—	—
Max-Friedrich von Schlechtendal	Oberst	Army	27 July 1917	—	
Eduard Ritter von Schleich	Oberleutnant	Bavarian Army; Luftstreitkräfte	4 December 1917	—	
Walter Freiherr von Schleinitz	Major	Army	31 October 1917	—	
Ludwig von Schlotheim	Oberst; Generalmajor	Army	20 September 1866	15 June 1871	
Heinrich Schmedes	Oberstleutnant	Army	5 October 1918	—	—
Eberhard Graf von Schmettow	Generalleutnant	Army	11 December 1916	4 August 1918	
Egon Graf von Schmettow	Generalleutnant	Army	4 November 1917	—	—
Hans Schmid	Oberstleutnant	Army	27 July 1917	—	—
Konstantin Schmidt von Knobelsdorf	Generalleutnant	Army	17 October 1915	21 August 1916	
Ehrhard Schmidt	Vizeadmiral	Navy	31 October 1917	—	—
Johann Ritter von Schmidtler	Major	Bavarian Army	26 October 1918	—	—
Walther Schnieber	Leutnant	Army	27 October 1917	—	—
Rudolf Schniewindt	Major	Army	4 August 1918	—	
Wilhelm Schniewindt	Major	Army	21 May 1918	—	—
Emil von Schnizer	Major	Württembergian Army	27 August 1918	—	—
Alexander von Schoeler	Generalmajor	Army	20 September 1866	—	
Roderich von Schoeler	Generalleutnant	Army	30 June 1918	—	
Albert Schoen	Major	Army	25 October 1918	—	—
Ernst von Schönfeldt	Major	Army	6 November 1918	—	—
Ferdinand Schörner	Leutnant	Bavarian Army	5 December 1917	—	
Friedrich von Scholtz	General der Artillerie	Army	3 September 1915	—	
Erich Scholtz	Hauptmann	Army	23 December 1917	—	—
Wilhelm Paul Schreiber	Leutnant	Luftstreitkräfte	29 May 1918	—	
Ludwig von Schröder	Admiral	Navy	20 October 1915	23 December 1917	
Richard von Schubert	General der Artillerie	Army	28 August 1916	—	
Georg von Schüssler	Generalleutnant	Army	22 April 1918	—	—
Arnold von Schutter	Oberst	Army	—	2 October 1815	—
Ernst Schütz	Oberstleutnant	Army	20 May 1917	—	—
Friedrich Graf von der Schulenburg	Oberst	Army	24 July 1917	23 March 1918	—
Karl Graf von der Schulenburg-Wolfsburg	Oberst	Army	8 October 1917	—	—
Walter Schulz	Major	Army	4 October 1918	—	
Otto Schultze	Kapitänleutnant	Navy	18 March 1918	—	—
Adolf Schwab	Oberstleutnant	Württembergian Army	6 November 1918	—	—
Detlof Graf von Schwerin	Oberst	Army	12 June 1918	—	
Oskar Schwerk	Oberstleutnant	Army	21 September 1916	2 May 1917	—
Walther Schwieger	Kapitänleutnant	Navy	30 July 1917	—	
Hans von Seeckt	Oberst; Generalmajor	Army	14 May 1915	27 November 1915	
Just Friedrich von Seelhorst	Major	Army	26 November 1917	—	—
Hans Sehmsdorff	Major	Army	17 October 1918	—	—
Karl Seidel	Hauptmann	Army	9 October 1918	—	—
Reinhard Seiler	Hauptmann	Army	31 January 1918	—	—
Fritz von Selle	Oberst	Army	6 January 1918	—	
Georg Sick	Oberstleutnant	Army	20 May 1917	—	—
Ludwig Sieger	Generalleutnant	Army	27 April 1918	3 November 1918	
Gustav Siess	Kapitänleutnant	Navy	24 April 1918	—	—
Friedrich Sixt von Armin	General der Infanterie	Army	10 August 1916	3 August 1917	
Alfred von Soden	Oberleutnant	Army; East Asia Expeditionary Corps	20 September 1900	—	—
Franz Freiherr von Soden	General der Infanterie	Württembergian Army	27 July 1917	—	
George Soldan	Hauptmann	Army	22 April 1918	—	—
Hans Sottorf	Hauptmann	Army	1 November 1918	—	—
Wilhelm Souchon	Vizeadmiral	Navy; Ottoman Navy	29 October 1916	—	
Oskar von Sperling	Generalmajor	Army	16 September 1866	-	
Theodor Sproesser	Major	Württembergian Army	10 December 1917	—	
Hermann von Staabs	Generalleutnant; General der Infanterie	Army	11 December 1916	15 May 1918	
Markus Stachow	Oberstleutnant	Army	28 November 1917	—	—
Max Stapff	Major	Army	23 December 1917	—	—
Hermann von Stein	Generalleutnant; General der Artillerie	Army	1 September 1916	8 April 1918	
Hermann von Stein zu Nord- und Ostheim	Generalleutnant	Bavarian Army	20 August 1917	24 November 1917	
Adolf Steinwachs	Major	Army	2 May 1917	—	—
Albrecht Steppuhn	Major	Army	17 June 1918	—	—
Otto von Stetten	Generalleutnant	Bavarian Army	22 September 1916	—	
Wolfgang Steinbauer	Oberleutnant	Navy	3 March 1918	—	—
Otto Steinbrinck	Oberleutnant	Navy	29 March 1916	—	
Karl Friedrich von Steinmetz	Major; Generalfeldmarschall	Army	19 September 1848	16 June 1871	
Karl Friedrich Franciscus von Steinmetz	Hauptmann; Generalmajor	Army	1807	1815	
Anatoly Stessel	Generalleutnant	Russian Army	10 January 1905	—	
Kuno von Steuben	General der Infanterie	Army	13 October 1915	—	
Otto Stobbe	Major	Army	6 November 1918	—	—
Julius von Stoeklern zu Grünholzek	Oberstleutnant	Army	23 June 1918	—	—
Gustav Stoffleth	Hauptmann	Army	22 January 1918	—	
Paulus von Stolzmann	Generalmajor	Army	7 July 1915	—	
Albrecht Graf von Stosch	Major	Army	21 October 1918	—	
Heinrich Strack	Hauptmann	Army	30 October 1918	—	—
Hermann von Strantz	General der Infanterie	Army	22 August 1915	—	
Peter Strasser	Fregattenkapitän	Navy	20 August 1917	—	
Edwin von Stülpnagel	Major	Army	4 August 1918	—	—
Karl von Stumpff	Generalleutnant	Army	22 April 1918	—	—
Wolff von Stutterheim	Oberstleutnant	Army	29 August 1918	—	—
Hans von Sydow	Oberstleutnant	Army	6 January 1918	—	—

== T ==
Name	Rank	Branch	Pour le Mérite	Oak Leaves	Image
Ludwig Freiherr von und zu der Tann-Rathsamhausen	General der Infanterie	Bavarian Army	22 December 1870	—	
Gerhard Tappen	Generalmajor	Army	11 September 1915	27 January 1916	
Friedrich von Taysen	Oberst	Army	6 January 1918	—	
Theodor Teetzmann	Generalmajor	Army	11 October 1917	—	
Rudolf Teichmann	Hauptmann	Army	18 May 1918	—	—
Otto Teschner	Oberstleutnant	Army	22 January 1918	—	
Wilhelm von Thadden	Oberstleutnant	Army	8 October 1917	—	—
Albrecht von Thaer	Oberstleutnant	Army	6 August 1917	—	
Karl Thom	Leutnant	Luftstreitkräfte	1 November 1918	—	—
Heinrich Ludwig August von Thümen	Major; Generalmajor	Army	15 June 1802	21 October 1813	
Emil Thuy	Leutnant	Luftstreitkräfte	30 June 1918	—	—
Paul Tiede	Generalmajor	Army	17 April 1918	25 October 1918	
August von Tippelskirch	Hauptmann	Army	15 October 1918	—	—
Ernst Ludwig von Tippelskirch	Stabskapitän; Generalmajor	Army	17 February 1807	18 June 1815	
Alfred von Tirpitz	Großadmiral	Navy	10 August 1915	—	
Georgi Todorov	General der Infanterie	Bulgarian Army	14 October 1917	—	
Emil Trebing	Leutnant	Army	14 April 1918	—	—
Horst Julius Freiherr Treusch von Buttlar-Brandenfels	Kapitänleutnant	Naval Aviation	9 April 1918	—	
Walter Trenck	Hauptmann	Army	15 July 1918	—	—
Joachim Christian von Tresckow	Generalmajor	Army	10 September 1747	—	—
Karl Alexander Wilhelm von Treskow	Major	Army	18 October 1812	—	—
Hans von Troilo	Oberstleutnant	Army	5 July 1918	—	—
Adolf von Trotha	Kapitän zur See	Navy	5 June 1916	—	
Lothar von Trotha	Generalleutnant	Army; Schutztruppe	2 November 1905	—	
Erich von Tschischwitz	Oberst	Army	9 November 1917	23 March 2918	
Wilhelm von Tümpling	Generalleutnant	Army	20 September 1866	—	
Adolf Ritter von Tutschek	Oberleutnant	Bavarian Army; Luftstreitkräfte	3 August 1917	—	
Ludwig Ritter von Tutschek	Generalmajor	Bavarian Army	8 December 1917	—	

== U ==
Name	Rank	Branch	Pour le Mérite	Oak Leaves	Image
Ernst von Uechtritz und Steinkirch	Generalmajor	Army	21 October 1918	—	—
Ernst Udet	Leutnant	Luftstreitkräfte	9 April 1918	—	
Umberto, Crown Prince of Italy	Generalmajor	Italian Army	29 May 1872	—	
Ernst von Unger	Major	Army	20 September 1866	—	
Walter von Unruh	Major	Army	21 April 1918	—	
Guido von Usedom	Kapitän zur See; Vizeadmiral	Navy	5 April 1902	23 August 1915	

== V ==
Name	Rank	Branch	Pour le Mérite	Oak Leaves	Image
Hans Peter von Vaernewyck	Major	Army	18 September 1918	—	—
Max Valentiner	Kapitänleutnant	Navy	26 December 1916	—	
Josef Veltjens	Leutnant	Luftstreitkräfte	16 August 1918	—	
Maximilian von Versen	Hauptmann	Army	20 September 1866	—	—
Detlew Vett	Generalleutnant	Army	4 October 1918	—	—
Victor Emmanuel II, King of Italy		Italian Army	19 May 1872	—	
Max Viebeg	Kapitänleutnant	Navy	30 January 1918	—	—
Konstantin Bernhard von Voigts-Rhetz	Generalleutnant; General der Infanterie	Army	11 September 1866	31 December 1870	
Alfred von Vollard-Bockelberg	Major	Army	4 November 1917	—	
Werner Voß	Leutnant	Luftstreitkräfte	8 April 1917	—	
Hans von Voss	Major	Army	23 December 1917	—	—

== W ==
Name	Rank	Branch	Pour le Mérite	Oak Leaves	Image
Alfred von Waldersee	Generalfeldmarschall	Army	—	30 July 1901	
Emil Waldorf	Generalleutnant	Army	1 November 1918	—	—
Alfred Freiherr von Waldstätten	Generalmajor	Austrian Army	3 November 1917	—	
Franz Walz	Hauptmann	Luftstreitkräfte	9 August 1918	—	
Curt Freiherr von Wängenheim	Oberst	Army	3 September 1917	—	
Hans Walther	Kapitänleutnant	Navy	9 January 1917	—	
Charles-Emmanuel de Warnery	Oberstleutnant	Army	October 1756	—	—
Hermann Ludwig von Wartensleben	Oberst	Army	—	19 January 1873	
Erwin Wassner	Kapitänleutnant	Navy	5 March 1918	—	
Oskar Freiherr von Watter	Generalleutnant	Württembergian Army	23 December 1917	3 November 1918	
Theodor Freiherr von Watter	General der Infanterie	Württembergian Army	1 September 1916	—	
Theordor von Weber	Oberstleutnant	Army	8 October 1918	—	
Otto Weddigen	Kapitänleutnant	Navy	24 October 1914	—	
Fritz Freiherr von Wedekind	Major	Army	15 August 1918	—	—
Hasso von Wedel	Generalmajor	Army	27 August 1917	24 November 1917	—
Richard Wellmann	Generalleutnant	Army	23 December 1917	26 October 1918	
Karl von Wenckstern	Hauptmann	Army	27 August 1918	—	—
Ralph Wenninger	Kapitänleutnant	Navy	30 March 1918	—	—
Karl Ritter von Wenninger	Generalleutnant	Bavarian Army	1 May 1917	—	
Hans von Werder	Oberst	Army	3 May 1918	—	—
Wilhelm Werner	Kapitänleutnant	Navy	18 August 1918	—	—
Eduard von Westhoven	Major	Army	1 April 1918	—	
Georg Wetzell	Major	Army	11 December 1916	1 November 1917	
Georg Wichura	General der Infanterie	Army	26 April 1917	8 June 1918	
Hermann Wilck	Hauptmann	Army	9 October 1918	—	—
Adolf Wild von Hohenborn	Generalleutnant	Army	2 August 1915	11 October 1918	
Ludwig Wilhelm Freiherr von Willisen	Major	Army	1 November 1917	—	—
Karl Willweber	Leutnant	Army	3 September 1918	—	—
Arnold von Winckler	Generalleutnant; General der Infanterie	Army	27 November 1915	15 June 1917	
Rudolf Windisch	Leutnant	Saxon Army; Luftstreitkräfte	6 June 1918	—	
Kurt Wintgens	Leutnant	Luftstreitkräfte	1 July 1916	—	
Eduard Wittekind	Hauptmann	Army	4 December 1917	—	—
Ludwig von Wittich	Oberst; Generalmajor	Army	20 September 1866	5 December 1870	
Friedrich Karl von Witzleben	Oberst	Army	23 June 1918	—	—
Kurt Wolff	Oberleutnant	Luftstreitkräfte	4 May 1917	—	
Horst von Wolff	Hauptmann	Army	28 November 1917	—	—
Siegfried Woltersdorf	Major	Army	29 October 1918	—	—
Remus von Woyrsch	General der Infanterie; Generaloberst	Army	25 October 1914	23 July 1915	
Friedrich Graf von Wrangel	Leutnant; General der Kavallerie	Army	18 July 1807	13 September 1848	
Karl von Wrangel	Generalmajor; Generalleutnant	Army	20 September 1866	5 December 1870	
Ernst von Wrisberg	Generalmajor	Major	8 April 1918	—	
Johann Jakob von Wunsch	Generalmajor	Army	2 November 1759	—	
Otto Wünsche	Kapitänleutnant	Navy	20 December 1917	—	—
Hermann Wülfing	Major	Army	30 October 1918	—	—
Kurt Wüsthoff	Leutnant	Luftstreitkräfte	22 November 1917	—	
Albrecht, Duke of Württemberg	Generaloberst; Generalfeldmarschall	Württembergian Army	22 August 1915	25 February 1918	
Prince August of Württemberg	General der Kavallerie	Army	3 August 1866	16 June 1871	
Duke William of Württemberg	Feldzeugmeister	Austrian Army	22 March 1864	—	
William II of Württemberg	General der Kavallerie	Württembergian Army	24 January 1917	—	
Fritz Wulff	Major	Army	8 October 1918	—	—
Gustav Adolf von Wulffen	Hauptmann	Army	21 April 1918	—	

== X, Y, Z ==
Name	Rank	Branch	Pour le Mérite	Oak Leaves	Image
Oskar Edler und Ritter von Xylander	General der Infanterie	Bavarian Army	20 August 1916	—	
Ernst Graf Yorck von Wartenburg	Major	Army	23 September 1918	—	
Ludwig Graf Yorck von Wartenburg	Generalleutnant	Army	27 May 1813	—	
Heinrich von Zastrow	Generalleutnant	Army	16 September 1866	—	
Hans Joachim von Zieten	Major	Army	May 1741	—	
Alfred Ziethen	Generalmajor	Army	14 June 1915	—	—
Nikola Zhekov	Major General	Bulgarian Army	18 January 1916	—	
Max Zunehmer	Oberstleutnant	Army	29 November 1917	—	—
Hans von Zwehl	General der Infanterie	Army	8 September 1914	17 October 1917	
