= Army Group German Crown Prince =

Army group of the Imperial German Army

Army Group German Crown Prince Army Group B
- Heeresgruppe Deutscher Kronprinz
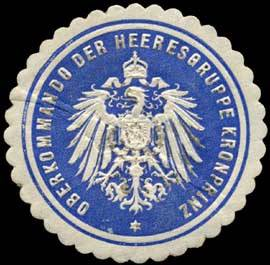
- Seal
- Active: 1915–1918
- Disbanded: 11 November 1918
- Country: German Empire
- Branch: Imperial German Army
- Engagements: World War I: Meuse–Argonne offensive

Commanders
- Supreme Commander: Wilhelm of Prussia

The Army Group German Crown Prince or Army Group B (German: Heeresgruppe Deutscher Kronprinz) was an Army Group of the German Army, which operated on the Western Front under command of Wilhelm, German Crown Prince, between 1 August 1915 and 11 November 1918 during World War I.

== Composition (1 August 1915 – April 1917) ==
- German 5th Army (Wilhelm, German Crown Prince then Ewald von Lochow then Max von Gallwitz)
- German Armee-Abteilung A (Ludwig von Falkenhausen then Karl Ludwig d'Elsa then Bruno von Mudra)
- German Armee-Abteilung B (Hans Gaede then Erich von Gündell)
- German Armee-Abteilung C (Hermann von Strantz then Max von Boehn)
- German 3rd Army (Karl von Einem) : 26 September - 7 December 1915 and again since July 1916

== Composition (April 1917 – February 1918) ==
- German 7th Army (Max von Boehn)
- German 1st Army (Fritz von Below)
- German 3rd Army (Karl von Einem)
- German 5th Army (Max von Gallwitz)

== Composition (4 February 1918 – 11 November 1918) ==
- German 18th Army (Oskar von Hutier) : except 12 August - 8 October 1918
- German 7th Army (Max von Boehn then Magnus von Eberhardt)
- German 1st Army (Fritz von Below then Bruno von Mudra then Otto von Below then Magnus von Eberhardt)
- German 3rd Army (Karl von Einem)

== Sources ==
- The Soldier's Burden
- Die Deutschen Heeresgruppen im Ersten Weltkrieg
- : Die deutschen Heeresgruppen Teil 1, Erster Weltkrieg
