= Péronne =

Péronne may refer to:

== Places ==
- Péronne, Saône-et-Loire, France
- Péronne, Somme, France
  - Château de Péronne
  - Arrondissement of Péronne
  - Canton of Péronne
- Péronne-en-Mélantois, France
- Péronnes-lez-Binche, Hainaut, Belgium

== People ==
- Peronne Goguillon (died 1679), alleged French witch

== See also ==
- Siege of Péronne, 1870–1871
- Treaty of Péronne (disambiguation)
