= Niezabyszewo railway station =

Railway station in Niezabyszewo, Poland

Coordinates: 54.1456°N 17.4114°E

Niezabyszewo

General information
- Location: Niezabyszewo; Poland
- Owner: Polskie Koleje Państwowe S.A.

Construction
- Structure type: Building: Yes (no longer used); Depot: Never existed Water tower: Never existed

History
- Former names: Damsdorf until 1945
Location

Niezabyszewo is a non-operational PKP railway station in Niezabyszewo (Pomeranian Voivodeship), Poland.

== Lines crossing the station ==
Start station	End station	Line type
Bytów	Miastko	Closed
