= Armee-Abteilung B =

Armee-Abteilung Gaede Armee-Abteilung B Army Detachment B
- Flag of the Staff of an Armee Oberkommando (1871–1918)
- Active: 19 September 1914 – post 11 November 1918
- Country: German Empire
- Type: Army
- Engagements: World War I

Armee-Abteilung Gaede / Armee-Abteilung B (Army Detachment B) was an army level command of the German Army in World War I. It served on the Western Front throughout its existence and formed the extreme left wing (up against the Swiss Border).

== History ==
After the 7th Army had repulsed the French invasion at the Battle of Mülhausen, it marched north to participate in the Race to the Sea. It left behind in Upper Alsace three Landwehr Brigades under the command of the Deputy Commander of XIV Corps, General der Infanterie Hans Gaede. This detachment was designated as Armee-Gruppe Gaede on 19 September 1914. It was established as Armee-Abteilung Gaede on 30 January 1915 and renamed on 4 September 1916 as Armee-Abteilung B. It was still in existence when the war ended, serving on the Western Front as part of Heeresgruppe Herzog Albrecht von Württemberg.

=== Order of Battle on formation ===
The following Orders of Battle illustrate the growth of the Armee-Abteilung during the war.

Organization of Armee-Abteilung Gaede on 10 December 1914
Army	Corps	Division
Armee-Abteilung Gaede	Under Army command	4 Mixed Landwehr Brigades

=== Order of Battle, 30 October 1918 ===
By the end of the war, the majority of the units assigned were lower quality Landwehr and Cavalry Schützen Divisions indicative of the relatively quiet sector that the Armee-Abteilung was operating in.

Organization of Armee-Abteilung B on 30 October 1918
Army	Corps	Division
Armee-Abteilung B	64th Corps (z.b.V.)	6th Bavarian Landwehr Division
Armee-Abteilung B	64th Corps (z.b.V.)	4th Cavalry Schützen Division
Armee-Abteilung B	64th Corps (z.b.V.)	7th Cavalry Schützen Division
Armee-Abteilung B	X Corps	26th Landwehr Division
Armee-Abteilung B	X Corps	30th Bavarian Reserve Division
Armee-Abteilung B	X Corps	31st Division
Armee-Abteilung B	XII Corps	44th Landwehr Division
Armee-Abteilung B	XII Corps	25th Landwehr Division

== Commanders ==
Armee-Abteilung B had the following commanders during its existence:

Armee-Abteilung Gaede / Armee-Abteilung B
From	Commander	Previously	Subsequently
19 September 1914	General der Infanterie Hans Gaede	Deputy Commander XIV Corps	Ill, died 16 September 1916
3 September 1916	General der Infanterie Erich von Gündell	V Reserve Corps	

== Glossary ==
- Armee-Abteilung or Army Detachment in the sense of "something detached from an Army". It is not under the command of an Army so is in itself a small Army.
- Armee-Gruppe or Army Group in the sense of a group within an Army and under its command, generally formed as a temporary measure for a specific task.
- Heeresgruppe or Army Group in the sense of a number of armies under a single commander.

== See also ==
- German Army order of battle, Western Front (1918)
- XIV Corps

== Bibliography ==
- Cron, Hermann (2002). Imperial German Army 1914–18: Organisation, Structure, Orders-of-Battle [first published: 1937]. Helion & Co. ISBN 1-874622-70-1.
- Ellis, John; Cox, Michael (1993). The World War I Databook. Aurum Press Ltd. ISBN 1-85410-766-6.
