= VII Reserve Corps =

VII Reserve Corps VII. Reserve-Korps
- Flag of the Staff of a Generalkommando (1871–1918)
- Active: 2 August 1914 - post November 1918
- Country: German Empire
- Type: Corps
- Size: Approximately 38,000 (on formation)
- Engagements: World War I Battle of the Frontiers

Insignia
- Abbreviation: VII RK

The VII Reserve Corps (German: VII. Reserve-Korps / VII RK) was a corps level command of the German Army in World War I.

== Formation ==
VII Reserve Corps was formed on the outbreak of the war in August 1914 as part of the mobilisation of the Army. It was initially commanded by General der Infanterie Hans von Zwehl, recalled from retirement. It was still in existence at the end of the war in the 1st Army, Heeresgruppe Deutscher Kronprinz on the Western Front.

=== Structure on formation ===
On formation in August 1914, VII Reserve Corps consisted of two divisions, made up of reserve units. In general, Reserve Corps and Reserve Divisions were weaker than their active counterparts

Reserve Infantry Regiments did not always have three battalions nor necessarily contain a machine gun company
Reserve Jäger Battalions did not have a machine gun company on formation
Reserve Cavalry Regiments consisted of just three squadrons
Reserve Field Artillery Regiments usually consisted of two abteilungen of three batteries each
Corps Troops generally consisted of a Telephone Detachment and four sections of munition columns and trains

In summary, VII Reserve Corps mobilised with 24 infantry battalions, 8 machine gun companies (48 machine guns), 6 cavalry squadrons, 12 field artillery batteries (72 guns) and 3 pioneer companies. 14th Reserve Division was slightly stronger than the norm as it included an active infantry brigade.

Corps	Division	Brigade	Units
VII Reserve Corps	13th Reserve Division	25th Reserve Infantry Brigade	13th Reserve Infantry Regiment
VII Reserve Corps	13th Reserve Division	25th Reserve Infantry Brigade	56th Reserve Infantry Regiment
VII Reserve Corps	13th Reserve Division	28th Reserve Infantry Brigade	39th Reserve Infantry Regiment
VII Reserve Corps	13th Reserve Division	28th Reserve Infantry Brigade	57th Reserve Infantry Regiment
VII Reserve Corps	13th Reserve Division	28th Reserve Infantry Brigade	7th Reserve Jäger Battalion
VII Reserve Corps	13th Reserve Division		5th Reserve Hussar Regiment
VII Reserve Corps	13th Reserve Division		13th Reserve Field Artillery Regiment
VII Reserve Corps	13th Reserve Division		4th Company, 7th Pioneer Battalion
VII Reserve Corps	13th Reserve Division		13th Reserve Divisional Pontoon Train
VII Reserve Corps	13th Reserve Division		7th Reserve Medical Company
VII Reserve Corps	14th Reserve Division	28th Infantry Brigade	39th Füsilier Regiment
VII Reserve Corps	14th Reserve Division	28th Infantry Brigade	159th Infantry Regiment
VII Reserve Corps	14th Reserve Division	27th Reserve Infantry Brigade	16th Reserve Infantry Regiment
VII Reserve Corps	14th Reserve Division	27th Reserve Infantry Brigade	53rd Reserve Infantry Regiment
VII Reserve Corps	14th Reserve Division		8th Reserve Hussar Regiment
VII Reserve Corps	14th Reserve Division		14th Reserve Field Artillery Regiment
VII Reserve Corps	14th Reserve Division		1st Reserve Company, 7th Pioneer Battalion
VII Reserve Corps	14th Reserve Division		2nd Reserve Company, 7th Pioneer Battalion
VII Reserve Corps	14th Reserve Division		21st Reserve Medical Company
VII Reserve Corps	Corps Troops		7th Reserve Telephone Detachment
VII Reserve Corps	Corps Troops		Munition Trains and Columns corresponding to the III Reserve Corps

== Combat chronicle ==
On mobilisation, VII Reserve Corps was assigned to the 2nd Army forming part of the right wing of the forces that invaded France and Belgium as part of the Schlieffen Plan offensive in August 1914.

== Commanders ==
VII Reserve Corps had the following commanders during its existence:

From	Rank	Name
	General	Max von Gallwitz
2 August 1914	General der Infanterie	Hans von Zwehl
17 December 1916	General der Infanterie	Franz Freiherr von Soden
27 August 1917	Generalleutnant	Otto von Garnier
3 December 1917	Generalleutnant	Richard Wellmann
15 June 1918	Generalleutnant	Arthur von Lindequist

== See also ==
- German Army order of battle (1914)
- German Army order of battle, Western Front (1918)

== Bibliography ==
- Cron, Hermann (2002) [1937]. Imperial German Army 1914-18: Organisation, Structure, Orders-of-Battle (repr. ed.). Helion & Co. ISBN 1-874622-70-1.
- Ellis, John; Cox, Michael (1993). The World War I Databook. Aurum Press. ISBN 1-85410-766-6.
