= Albert von Barnekow =

Prussian general (1809–1895)

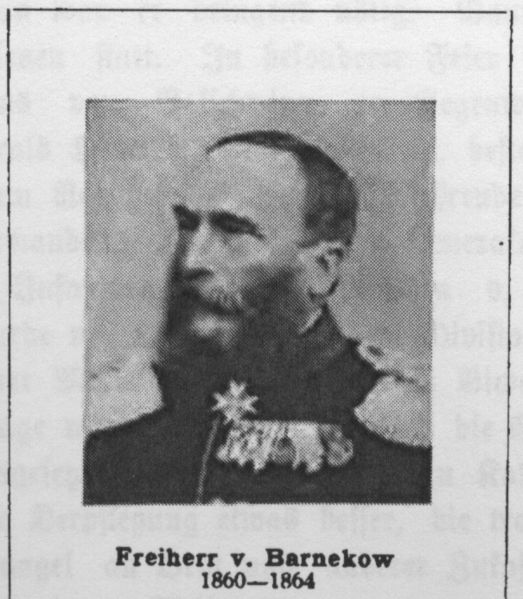
- Born: August 2, 1809; Braunsberg, East Prussia, Prussia
- Died: May 24, 1895 (aged 85); Naumburg, Province of Saxony, Germany
- Spouse: Julie von der Osten (m. 1842–1895)
- Military career
- Allegiance: Prussia; North German Confederation; German Empire
- Branch: Prussian Army; Imperial German Army
- Service years: 1826–1883
- Rank: General of the Infantry
- Conflicts: Second Schleswig War Austro-Prussian War: Battle of Trautenau; Battle of Königgrätz; Franco-Prussian War: Battle of Spicheren; Battle of Mars-la-Tour; Battle of Gravelotte; Siege of Metz; Battle of Noisseville (WIA); Battle of Amiens; Battle of Hallue; Siege of Péronne; Battle of Saint-Quentin

Christof Gottlieb Albert Freiherr von Barnekow (August 2, 1809 – May 24, 1895) was a Prussian General of the Infantry who commanded the 16th Division during the Franco-Prussian War and was a recipient of the Order of the Black Eagle.

== Birth ==
Barnekow was the son of the Prussian Rittmeister Gottlieb von Barnekow (1781–1814) and his wife Laurette, widowed by Brandt, née Gaesbeck (1787–1863).

== Military career ==
Barnekow joined the 1st Infantry Regiment of the Prussian Army in Königsberg on July 11, 1826, as a musketeer. He continued his uninterrupted military service for the next 40 years of peace, rising to the rank of General of the Infantry. In 1829, Barnekow was second lieutenant and from 1831, he was in the 39th Lower Rhine Fusilier Regiment and from 1833 to 1836, he was the adjutant of the II Battalion. In 1841, Barnekow was promoted to first lieutenant and in 1846 he was promoted to captain and finally in 1852, promoted to Major. As such, Barnekow was commander of the 1st Battalion of the 39th Lower Rhine Fusilier Regiment. He was then promoted to lieutenant colonel in 1858 and was promoted to colonel in 1860. He then he commanded the 6th Rhenish Infantry Regiment No. 68 from July 1, 1860, to January 8, 1864. In 1864 he took part in the Second Schleswig War as a major general but wouldn't see active military service.

Barnekow saw his first active combat in the Austro-Prussian War at the Battle of Trautenau. He was part of the 1st Division in the 1st Army Corps as the commander of the 2nd Infantry Brigade under Adolf von Bonin. His brigade formed the reserve and secured the retreat of the corps. For his services in the battle, he was awarded the Pour le Mérite on September 20, 1866. Later in the war, he took part in the Battle of Königgrätz.

== Franco-Prussian War ==
On October 30, 1866, Barnekow was promoted to commander of the 16th Division in Trier and as such on December 31, 1866, to lieutenant general. He also led the Division during the Franco-Prussian War. The first battle involving the unit took place in the Battle of Spicheren, when he intervened with his division in the battle of his own accord as his troops and the 5th and 13th Divisions had been alarmed by the noise of the battle. These additional units forced the French to retreat. At the Battle of Mars-la-Tour, the 16th Division reached the battlefield together with the remaining units of the VIII Corps and X Corps in the late afternoon and then immediately intervened in the fighting. He participated without order again as Barnekow had set out in the direction of the cannon fire.

After his participation at the Battle of Gravelotte, Barnekow and his units were part of the besieging army at Metz. Barnekow also participated at the Battle of Noisseville but got fractured in the foot during the battle. Despite this however, the capitulation of the fortress on October 27, 1870, the 16th Division was transferred to northern France, where he participated at the Battle of Amiens, the Battle of Hallue and the Siege of Péronne until January 9, 1871. Ten days later, Barnekow led the right wing in the Battle of Saint-Quentin, with which he entered the city as the first unit and forced the French to a hasty retreat, in which large parts of the northern army were then captured. For his service in the war, he received the Iron Cross, 2nd and 1st Class and the Oak Leaves for Pour le Mérite.

== Later years ==
After the war, he was briefly transferred to the army officers and then assigned to deputizing for the Kommandierenden Generals of the 1st Army Corps in East Prussia. On March 22, 1872, Barnekow received an endowment of 40,000 thalers for his many years of service and was appointed chief of the 68th Rhineland Infantry Regiment on September 14 of the same year. After his promotion to General of the Infantry, he was appointed as commander of the I Army Corps on September 19, 1873. On August 2, 1876, on his 50th anniversary of service, Barnekow received the Grand Cross of the Order of the Red Eagle with oak leaves and swords on the ring. Three years later, Wilhelm I awarded him the Order of the Black Eagle. On June 5, 1883, Barnekow was finally made available in his position as chief of the 68th Rhineland and awarded the star of the Grand Commander of the Royal House Order of Hohenzollern before finally retiring that year.

== Family ==
Barnekow married Julie von der Osten (1818–1902) on October 10, 1842, in Zinten and had following children:

- Albert Christoph Tassilo (b. 1843)
- Julia (b. 1844)
- Hermann Lebrecht Alfred (1847–1848)
- Hermann (born 1851), Prussian major
- Marie (* 1853) ⚭ Dr. Paul Bienko, Prussian police chief

== See also ==
- List of the Pour le Mérite (military class) recipients

== Bibliography ==
- (in German) Gothaisches Genealogisches Taschenbuch der Freiherrlichen Häuser. 1918. Achtundsechzigster Jahrgang, Justus Perthes, Gotha 1917, S. 16.
- (in German) Kurt von Priesdorff:Literature by and about Albert von Barnekow in the German National Library catalogue, Volume 7, Hanseatische Verlagsanstalt Hamburg, o. O. Hamburg, 1939, p. 392–395, Nr. 2357
