= 14th Reserve Division =

14th Reserve Division (14. Reserve-Division)
- Active: 1914-1919
- Country: Germany
- Branch: Army
- Type: Infantry
- Size: Approx. 15,000
- Engagements: World War I: Great Retreat, Battle of Verdun, Second Battle of the Aisne, German spring offensive, Hundred Days Offensive

The 14th Reserve Division (14. Reserve-Division) was a unit of the Imperial German Army in World War I. The division was formed on the mobilization of the German Army in August 1914. The division was disbanded in 1919, during the demobilization of the German Army after World War I. The division was a reserve division of the VII Reserve Corps and was recruited primarily in the Province of Westphalia and the Rhine Province. The division included an active infantry brigade from the 14th Division.

== Combat chronicle ==
The 14th Reserve Division fought on the Western Front, participating in the opening German offensive, which led to the Allied Great Retreat, including the capture of Namur and Maubeuge. Thereafter, the division remained in the line in the Aisne region until October 1915, and then went into Army reserve for two months. It fought in the Battle of Verdun from February to September 1916, and remained in the line at Verdun thereafter. It went to the Somme region at the end of 1916 and to the Champagne region in late January 1917, fighting in the Second Battle of the Aisne, also called the Third Battle of Champagne, from April to May. After a few months near Reims, the division went to the region along the Ailette River. In 1918, it participated in the German spring offensive. It was then primarily on the defensive, resisting various Allied offensives including those of the Hundred Days Offensive. Allied intelligence rated the division as first class.

== Order of battle on mobilization ==
The order of battle of the 14th Reserve Division on mobilization was as follows:

- 28. Infanterie-Brigade
  - Niederrheinisches Füsilier-Regiment Nr. 39
  - 8. Lothringisches Infanterie-Regiment Nr. 159
- 27. Reserve-Infanterie-Brigade
  - Reserve-Infanterie-Regiment Nr. 16
  - Reserve-Infanterie-Regiment Nr. 53
- Reserve-Husaren-Regiment Nr. 8
- Reserve-Feldartillerie-Regiment Nr. 14
- 1. Reserve-Kompanie/Westfälisches Pionier-Bataillon Nr. 7
- 2. Reserve-Kompanie/Westfälisches Pionier-Bataillon Nr. 7

== Order of battle on January 1, 1918 ==
The 14th Reserve Division was triangularized in March 1915. Over the course of the war, other changes took place, including the formation of artillery and signals commands and a pioneer battalion. The order of battle on January 1, 1918, was as follows:

- 27. Reserve-Infanterie-Brigade
  - Reserve-Infanterie-Regiment Nr. 16
  - Reserve-Infanterie-Regiment Nr. 53
  - 8. Lothringisches Infanterie-Regiment Nr. 159
- 1.Eskadron/Reserve-Husaren-Regiment Nr. 5
- Artillerie-Kommandeur 102
  - Reserve-Feldartillerie-Regiment Nr. 14
- Stab Pionier-Bataillon Nr. 314
  - 1.Reserve-Kompanie/Westfälisches Pionier-Bataillon Nr. 7
  - 2.Reserve-Kompanie/Westfälisches Pionier-Bataillon Nr. 7
  - Minenwerfer-Kompanie Nr. 214
- Divisions-Nachrichten-Kommandeur 414
