= Hans von Zwehl =

Prussian officer

Johann Hans von Zwehl
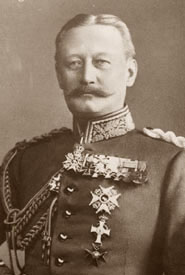
- Born: 27 July 1851; Osterode am Harz, Kingdom of Hannover
- Died: 28 May 1926 (aged 74); Berlin, Weimar Republic
- Military career
- Allegiance: Prussia; German Empire
- Branch: Prussian Army; Imperial German Army
- Service years: 1870–1909, 1914–1918
- Rank: General der Infanterie
- Commands: 30th Infantry Brigade; 13th Division; VII Reserve Corps
- Conflicts: Franco-Prussian War; World War I
- Awards: Pour le Mérite with oak leaves

Johann Hans von Zwehl was a Prussian officer who was involved in Franco-Prussian War and World War I. During the latter he served as commander of the VII Reserve Corps.

== Life ==
Johann Hans von Zwehl was born in 1851. He joined the military in 1870 and participated in the Franco-Prussian War where he received the Iron Cross (2nd Class). After the war he stayed in the military and rose through the ranks. In 1899 he became an Oberst and three years later was named commander of 30th Infantry Brigade. In 1902 he was promoted to Generalmajor. Four years later, he became Generalleutnant and commander of the 13th Division. He retired from the army in 1909.

Von Zwehl was brought out of his retirement when World War I began and was assigned to lead the VII Reserve Corps, which was part of the 2nd Army. He was involved in, and eventually led, the Siege of Maubeuge. He received the French surrender and was awarded with the prestigious Pour le Mérite on 8 September 1914. In September 1915 his corps was transferred to the 5th Army and was deployed in the Battle of Verdun. It suffered serious losses throughout the year-long campaign, and von Zwehl was released from command in December. He served as Military Governor of Antwerp until the end of the war. He also received the oak leaves of the Pour le Merite on 8 September 1917. On 25 November 1918, Zwehl retired from the army. Von Zwehl wrote about military history and continued to write after the war, also being Erich von Falkenhayn's authorized biographer. He died in 1926.

== See also ==
- List of the Pour le Mérite (military class) recipients

Military offices
Preceded by New Formation	Commander, VII Reserve Corps; 2 August 1914 – 17 December 1916	Succeeded by Generalleutnant Franz Freiherr von Soden
