= Otto von Garnier =

General der Kavallerie Otto von Garnier
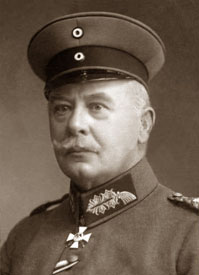
- Born: Otto Wladislaus Eduard Konstantin von Garnier; 1 May 1858; Prudnik, Kingdom of Prussia
- Died: 17 June 1947 (aged 89) Hechingen, Germany
- Buried: Baden-Baden cemetery
- Allegiance: German Empire (to 1918)
- Branch: Imperial German Army
- Service years: 1876–1918
- Rank: General of the Cavalry
- Commands: 4th Cavalry Division; V Reserve Corps; VII Reserve Corps
- Conflicts: World War I

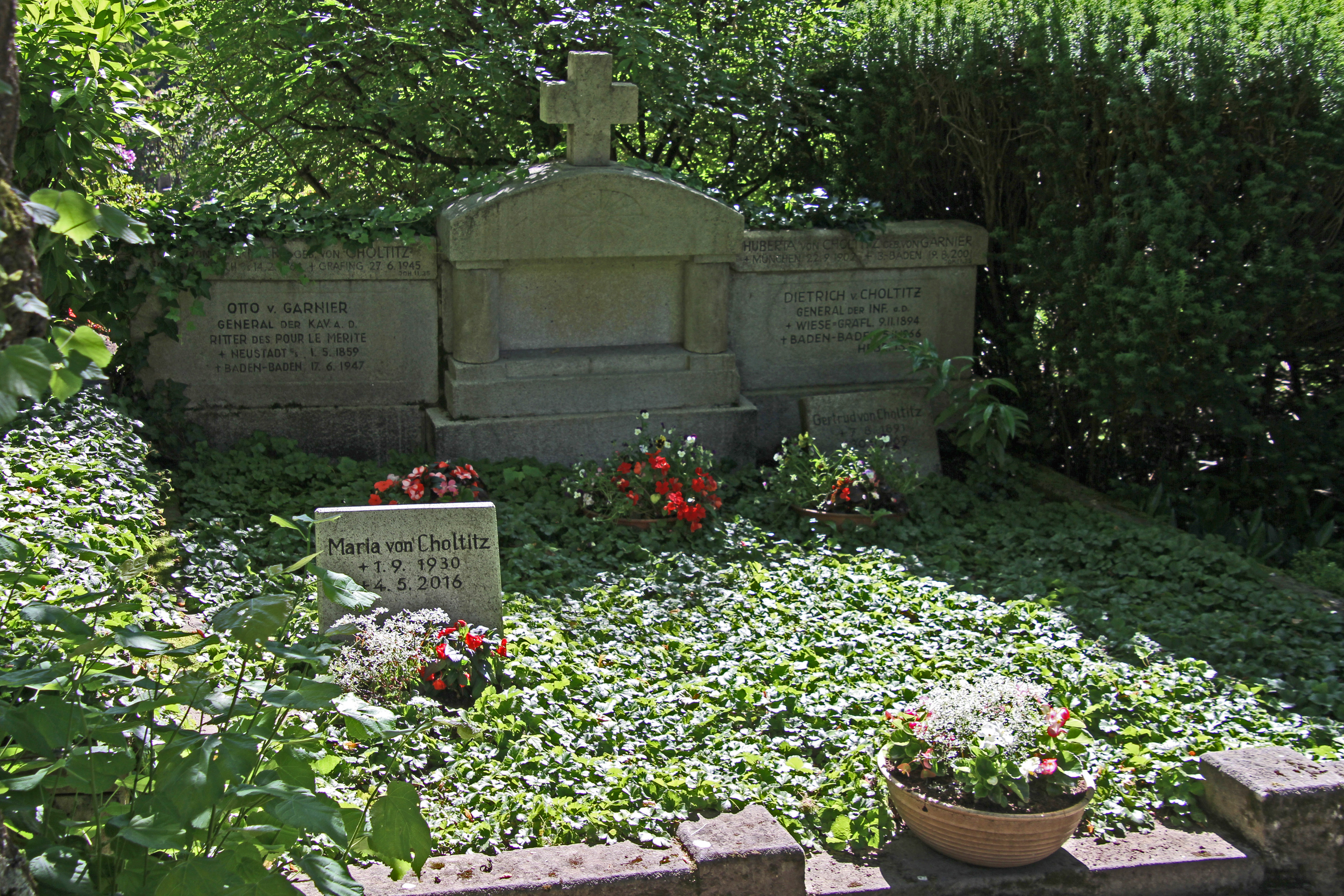
Grave of Otto von Garnier and Dietrich von Choltitz in Baden-Baden

Otto Wladislaus Eduard Konstantin von Garnier (German pronunciation: [ɔto: fɔn garni:r]; 1 May 1858 – 17 June 1947) was a German General of the Cavalry during World War I.

== Life and army career ==
Otto von Garnier was born in Neustadt in Oberschlesien (currently Prudnik, Poland) as a son of a Prussian, Lieutenant Otto Wladislaus Aloys Joseph Ernst Eduard von Garnier (1830–1908), and his wife Agnes Laurette von Mitzlaff (1837–1914).

On 1 October 1876 von Garnier joined the Husaren-Regiment „Graf Goetzen“ Nr. 6 as a Fahnenjunker. Later, he became a Rittmeister and joined the Großer Generalstab in Berlin. He was promoted to major on 22 March 1897, and an Oberstleutnant on 11 September 1903.

During World War I he served as a division- and corps-level commander of Imperial German troops. He was in command of 4th Cavalry Division, which was part of the force that moved into neutral Belgium to invest the fortress city of Liege. He was severely wounded at Ciechanów on 21 November 1914. In August - September 1915, at the head of the cavalry corps, he led the Sventsyansky breakthrough (Конница в Виленской операции 1915-го). He was awarded with a Pour le Mérite on 17 October 1916. He replaced Erich von Gündell as a commander of V. Reservekorps and Franz von Soden as a commander of VII. Reservekorps. Garnier retired from active duty in March 1918. His daughter Huberta had married General of the Infantry Dietrich von Choltitz.

== Awards ==
- Order of the Crown (Prussia) (2nd Class)
- Service award
- Order of the Zähringer Lion (1st Class)
- Military Merit Order (Bavaria) (Officer's Cross)
- House and Merit Order of Peter Frederick Louis
- Reußisches Ehrenkreuz
- Albert Order (Komturkreuz II)
- Lippischer Hausorden (3rd Class)
- Order of the Crown (Württemberg) (Ehrenkreuz)
- Order of Orange-Nassau
- Order of Saint Stanislaus (2nd Class)
- Crosses of Military Merit (2nd Class)
- Iron Cross (1st and 2nd Class)
- House Order of Hohenzollern
- Pour Le Merite
