= Albert von Memerty =

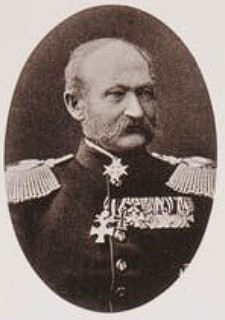

Albert von Memerty (8 December 1814 – 24 January 1896) was a general in the armies of the Kingdom of Prussia and Imperial Germany.

Memerty was born in Damsdorf (now part of Gmina Bytów) near Bütow in Pomerania. He enlisted in the Prussian Army on 8 March 1832, joining Inf. Rgt. Nr. 4 as a soldier. Promotions to Officer took place on 18 April 1835; to Captain in 1852; and to Major in 1859 with the 13. Westphalian Reserve Regiment. The regiment became the 5th Westphalian Inf. Rgt. Nr. 53 following a reorganization of the Army.

Memerty first saw combat in Prussia's Second Schleswig War against Denmark. He took part in the Battle of Dybbøl and in the Battle of Als.

Just before the outbreak of the Austro-Prussian War in 1866, Memerty was named Colonel and Commander of the 4. East Prussian Grenadiers Regiment Nr. 5. He led that regiment on June 27 during the Battle of Trautenau.

At the beginning of the Franco-Prussian War, he was promoted to General Major and placed in command of Rgts. 4 and 44, which together comprised the 3. Infantry Brigade, which was in turn part of the First Army under General Karl Friedrich von Steinmetz. He saw combat in that war with the Battle of Borny–Colombey on 14 August, then from 31 August to 1 September at the Battle of Noiseville. He participated in the Siege of Metz, though he was forced to take leave due to illness. He last saw combat during the Battle of Pertry-Poeuilly on 17 January 1871, during which he was seriously wounded.

Memerty was awarded the Iron Cross First Class and the Pour le Merite for his achievements. On 2 November 1871 he was named Commander of Danzig, and, following his promotion to Lt. General, on 14 August 1875, was granted his pension.

Memerty died on 24 January 1896 in Wiesbaden.

== Sources ==
- v. Loebell, Jahresbericht ueber die Veraenderungen und Fortschritte im Militaerwesen. XXIII. Jahregang 1896, Berlin.
- B. v. Poten. "Albert von Memerty." Allgemeine Deutsche Biographie.
- Priesdorff, Kurt v. Soldatisches Fuehertum. Hamburg: Haseatisches Verlagsandstalt, 1933. Vol. 8, pp. 267–269.
