= Treaty of Péronne =

There exist multiple Treaties of Péronne signed in Péronne, France:

- Treaty of Péronne (1200)
- Treaty of Péronne (1468)
- Treaty of Péronne (1641)
