= Siege of Péronne =

- Part of Franco-Prussian War
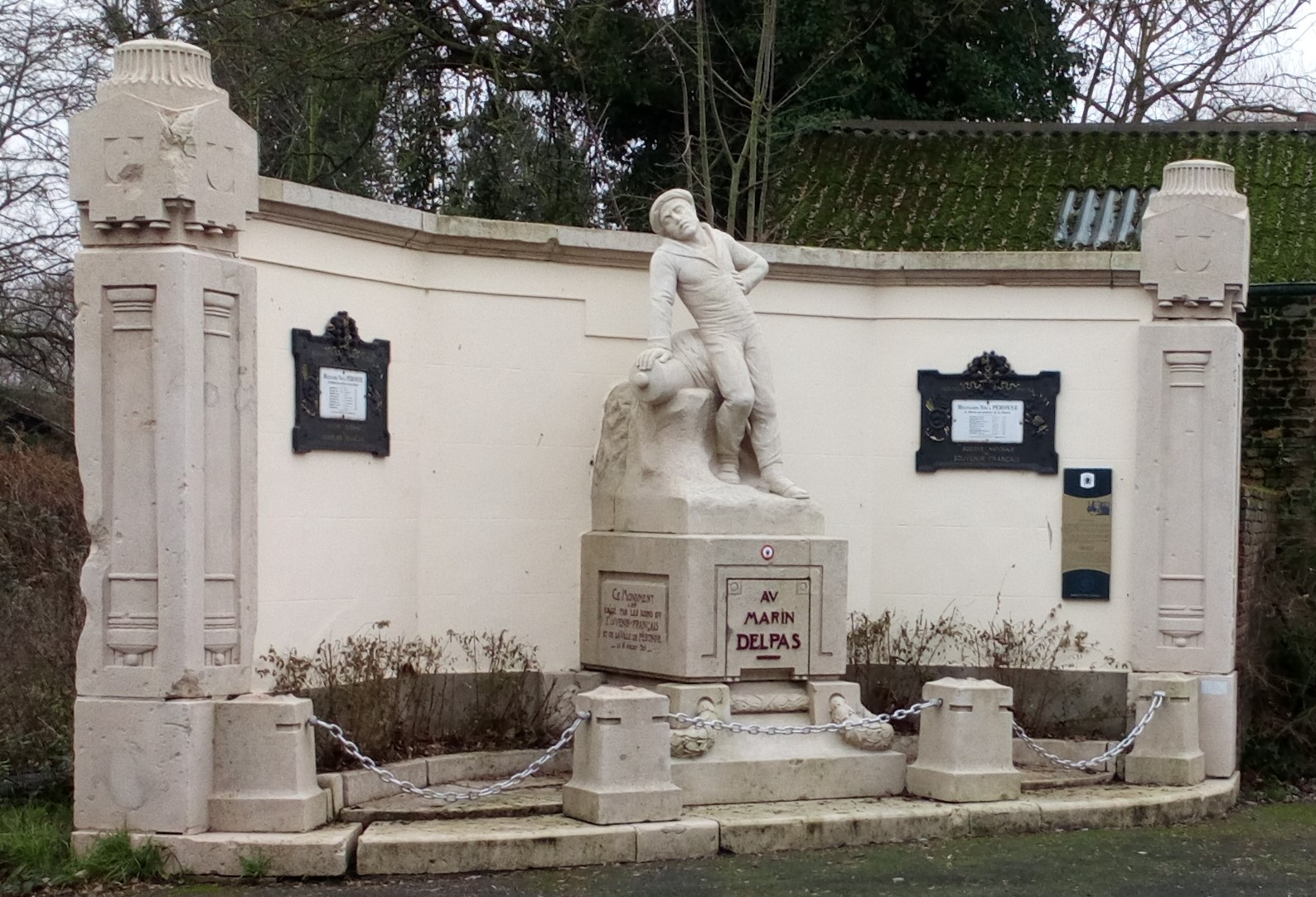
- Monument to Jean Delpas for the Defense of Péronne from 1870
Date	December 26, 1870 – January 9, 1871
Location	Péronne, Somme, France 49°55′46″N 2°56′21″E
Result	German Victory

Belligerents
French Republic	North German Confederation: Prussia

Commanders and leaders
Louis Faidherbe; Colonel Gamier	August von Goeben; Albert von Barnekow; Georg von Kameke

Strength
3,000 – 3,500 troops, 70 artillery	10–11 battalions, 8 divisional cavalry and reserve Divisions No. 3, 9 field guns

Casualties and losses
12 soldiers and 4 civilians killed, 35 soldiers and 50 civilians wounded, 3,000 people were captured, 2 flags, 47 artillery pieces and a large amount of ammunition were seized	Unknown

The siege of Peronne was a battle during the Franco-Prussian War, from December 26, 1870 until January 9, 1871, in Péronne, Somme of France. The German siege force, under the command of Lieutenant Generals August von Goeben and Albert von Barnekow, forced the French army at Péronne- which could not be rescued and had to surrender after more than a week under the bombardment of the Prussian army. With the victory, the armies of Albert von Barnekow captured a defending force of thousands of French soldiers in Peronne (including 150 marines and soldiers of the Garde Mobile ), and obtained a large number of cannons and war materials to the Prussians hands. In general, the advantage of the artillery of the Prussians as well as the dynamism of German officers is credited with leading to German victories in the sieges of French fortresses, and the success at the Siege of Péronne solidified German control over the river Somme.

== The battle ==
The fortress of Péronne on the Somme was not of great strategic value, but threatened the movements of the Prussian First Army from behind, and impeded communication between the railways at Amiens and the railways at Tergnier. As a result, the French garrison at Péronne caught the attention of the German army, and Lieutenant General Von Barnekow was ordered to capture Péronne with a siege force. Faced with its predicament, the First Army also deployed a formation to support the army besieging Péronne, and these support forces were stationed at Bapaume. Lieutenant-General August von Goeben was the chief commander of the siege and support forces. After a few sporadic skirmishes between the armies of the two factions, on December 27, 1870, the German army initiated the blockade of Péronne. During that day, with several field artillery batteries, Lieutenant General Georg von Kameke of Germany launched artillery fire that quickly ignited the town. From December 27 to December 29, the Germans continued their artillery attack and at times encountered fierce French resistance. The commander of the German artillery at Amiens, Colonel Schmidt prepared the means of siege for the Germans at Péronne, and on December 30, these guns were brought to Péronne. Meanwhile, the French Army of the North, commanded by General Louis Faidherbe, withdrew from Amiens. On January 2, 1871, German troops began shelling, at the same time a French army on its way from Arras to Bapaume to aid Péronne was repelled by the Germans. Within two days, the German artillery bombardment was successful, but it was later halted: fighting at Bapaume broke out again on 3 January, in which the German army foiled Faidherbe's attempt to relieve Péronne.

== Aftermath ==
After the victory at Bapaume, the artillery of the siege force was significantly reinforced, and at the same time they continued to fire fiercely. Faced with desperation, the French garrison at the fortress of Péronne under the command of Colonel Gamier finally surrendered to the German army on January 9 after 14 days of fighting. During the Siege of Péronne, the Prussian artillery bombardment caused considerable damage to the town.
