= Niezabyszewo =

- Village
- Location within Poland
- Coordinates: 54°8′7″N 17°25′36″E
- Country: Poland
- Voivodeship: Pomeranian
- County: Bytów
- Gmina: Bytów
- Population: 810

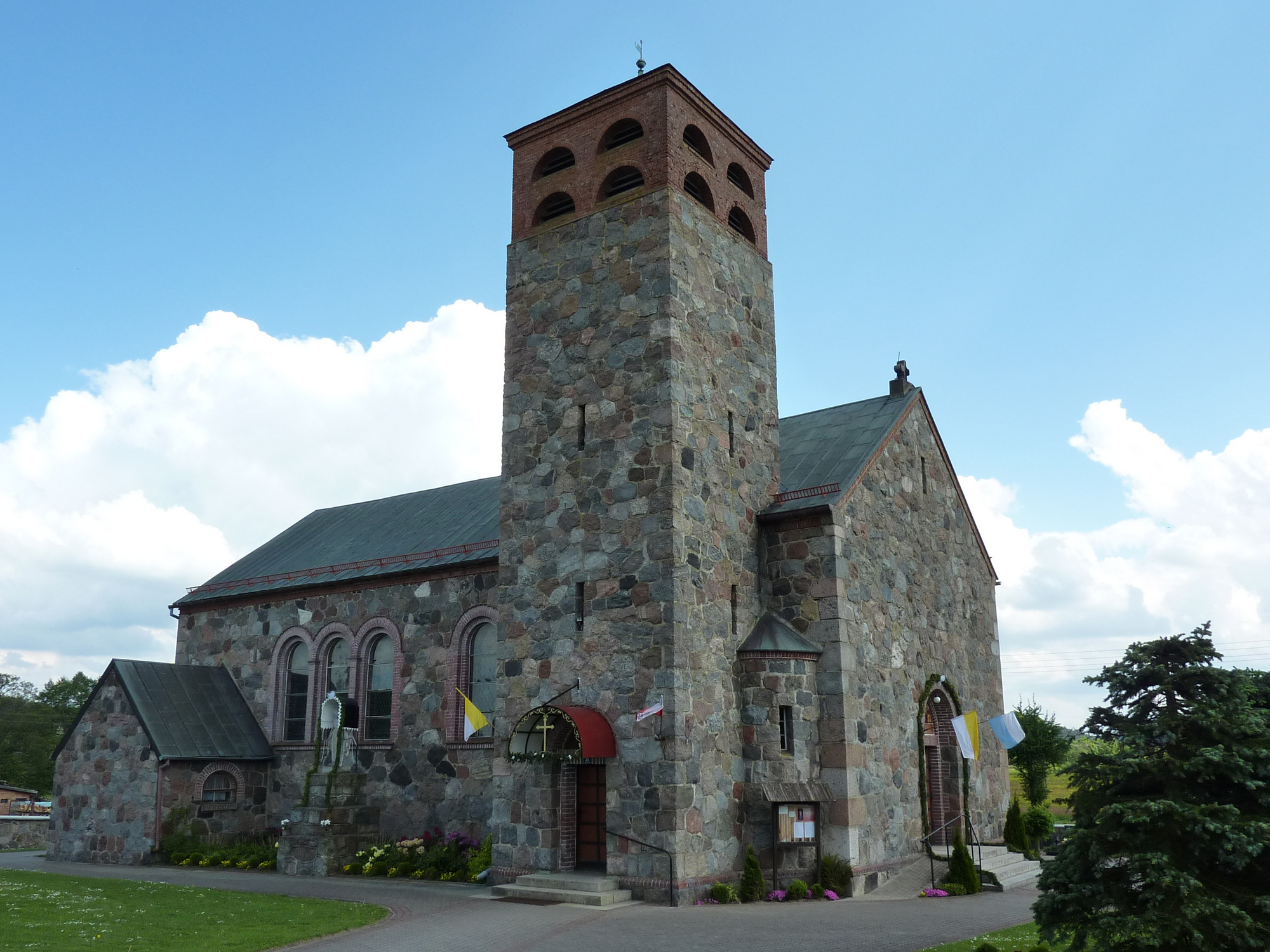
The church in Niezabyszewo

Niezabyszewo [ɲɛzabɨˈʂɛvɔ] (German: Damsdorf) is a village in the administrative district of Gmina Bytów, within Bytów County, Pomeranian Voivodeship, in northern Poland.

== Notable residents ==
- Albert von Memerty (1814–1896), Prussian general
