= V Reserve Corps =

V Reserve Corps V. Reserve-Korps
- Flag of the Staff of a Generalkommando (1871–1918)
- Active: 2 August 1914 - post November 1918
- Country: German Empire
- Type: Corps
- Size: Approximately 38,000 (on formation)
- Engagements: World War I Battle of the Frontiers

Insignia
- Abbreviation: V RK

The V Reserve Corps (German: V. Reserve-Korps / V RK) was a corps level command of the German Army in World War I.

== Formation ==
V Reserve Corps was formed on the outbreak of the war in August 1914 as part of the mobilisation of the Army. It was initially commanded by General der Infanterie Erich von Gündell, brought out of retirement. It was still in existence at the end of the war in the 5th Army, Heeresgruppe Gallwitz on the Western Front.

=== Structure on formation ===
On formation in August 1914, V Reserve Corps consisted of two divisions, made up of reserve units. In general, Reserve Corps and Reserve Divisions were weaker than their active counterparts

Reserve Infantry Regiments did not always have three battalions nor necessarily contain a machine gun company
Reserve Jäger Battalions did not have a machine gun company on formation
Reserve Cavalry Regiments consisted of just three squadrons
Reserve Field Artillery Regiments usually consisted of two abteilungen of three batteries each
Corps Troops generally consisted of a Telephone Detachment and four sections of munition columns and trains

In summary, V Reserve Corps mobilised with 22 infantry battalions, 7 machine gun companies (42 machine guns), 6 cavalry squadrons, 12 field artillery batteries (72 guns) and 3 pioneer companies. 10th Reserve Division was slightly stronger than the norm as it included an active infantry brigade.

Corps	Division	Brigade	Units
V Reserve Corps	9th Reserve Division	17th Reserve Infantry Brigade	6th Reserve Infantry Regiment
V Reserve Corps	9th Reserve Division	17th Reserve Infantry Brigade	7th Reserve Infantry Regiment
V Reserve Corps	9th Reserve Division	19th Reserve Infantry Brigade	19th Reserve Infantry Regiment
V Reserve Corps	9th Reserve Division	19th Reserve Infantry Brigade	5th Reserve Jäger Battalion
V Reserve Corps	9th Reserve Division		3rd Reserve Dragoon Regiment
V Reserve Corps	9th Reserve Division		9th Reserve Field Artillery Regiment
V Reserve Corps	9th Reserve Division		4th Company, 5th Pioneer Battalion
V Reserve Corps	9th Reserve Division		9th Reserve Divisional Pontoon Train
V Reserve Corps	9th Reserve Division		19th Reserve Medical Company
V Reserve Corps	10th Reserve Division	77th Infantry Brigade	37th Füsilier Regiment
V Reserve Corps	10th Reserve Division	77th Infantry Brigade	155th Infantry Regiment
V Reserve Corps	10th Reserve Division	50th Reserve Infantry Brigade	37th Reserve Infantry Regiment
V Reserve Corps	10th Reserve Division	50th Reserve Infantry Brigade	46th Reserve Infantry Regiment
V Reserve Corps	10th Reserve Division		6th Reserve Uhlan Regiment
V Reserve Corps	10th Reserve Division		10th Reserve Field Artillery Regiment
V Reserve Corps	10th Reserve Division		1st Reserve Company, 5th Pioneer Battalion
V Reserve Corps	10th Reserve Division		2nd Reserve Company, 5th Pioneer Battalion
V Reserve Corps	10th Reserve Division		10th Reserve Divisional Pontoon Train
V Reserve Corps	10th Reserve Division		5th Reserve Medical Company
V Reserve Corps	Corps Troops		5th Reserve Telephone Detachment
V Reserve Corps	Corps Troops		Munition Trains and Columns corresponding to the III Reserve Corps

== Combat chronicle ==
On mobilisation, V Reserve Corps was assigned to the 5th Army forming part of the centre of the forces for the Schlieffen Plan offensive in August 1914.

== Commanders ==
V Reserve Corps had the following commanders during its existence:

From	Rank	Name
2 August 1914	Generalleutnant	Erich von Gündell
2 September 1914	General der Infanterie	Erich von Gündell
3 September 1916	Generalleutnant	Otto von Garnier
27 August 1917	Generalleutnant	Viktor Kühne
21 November 1917	General der Infanterie	Franz Freiherr von Soden

== See also ==
- German Army order of battle (1914)
- German Army order of battle, Western Front (1918)

== Bibliography ==
- Cron, Hermann (2002). Imperial German Army 1914-18: Organisation, Structure, Orders-of-Battle [first published: 1937]. Helion & Co. ISBN 1-874622-70-1.
- Ellis, John; Cox, Michael (1993). The World War I Databook. Aurum Press Ltd. ISBN 1-85410-766-6.
- Histories of Two Hundred and Fifty-One Divisions of the German Army which Participated in the War (1914-1918), compiled from records of Intelligence section of the General Staff, American Expeditionary Forces, at General Headquarters, Chaumont, France 1919. The London Stamp Exchange Ltd. 1989 [1920]. ISBN 0-948130-87-3.
- The German Forces in the Field; 7th Revision, 11th November 1918; Compiled by the General Staff, War Office. Imperial War Museum, London and the Battery Press. 1995 [1918]. ISBN 978-1-870423-95-3.
