= Hans Gaede =

World War I Prussian general

- Born: 19 February 1852; Kolberg, Pomerania, Kingdom of Prussia
- Died: 16 September 1916 (aged 64); Freiburg im Breisgau, Baden, German Empire
- Military career
- Allegiance: North German Confederation; German Empire
- Branch: Prussian Army; Imperial German Army
- Service years: 1870–1916
- Rank: General of Infantry
- Unit: XIV Corps
- Commands: Thorn Fortress; 23rd Infantry Regiment; 84th Infantry Brigade; 33rd Division; Army Detachment Gaede
- Conflicts: Franco-Prussian War; World War I
- Awards: Pour le Mérite

Hans Emil Alexander Gaede (19 February 1852 in Kolberg – 16 September 1916 in Freiburg im Breisgau) was a Prussian officer, and later General of Infantry during World War I. He commanded Army Detachment Gaede and was a recipient of the Pour le Mérite.

== Life ==
Gaede was born on 18 February 1852 in the Kingdom of Prussia. He entered the army in 1870 as a cadet in the 2nd Grenadier Regiment and participated in the Franco-Prussian War. He was commissioned as a Second Lieutenant on 18 November 1870.

Reactivated for World War I; Gaede was Deputy Commander of the XIV Corps, commanded by Ernst von Hoiningen. He later got the command of six landwehr regiments which became the Army Detachment Gaede, or Army Detachment B. Gaede lead his troops in defending the upper Alsace region, however serious illness resulted in Gaede being retired again in September 1916. He died mere weeks later, at the age of 64.

== Awards ==
- Iron Cross 2nd Class (1870)
- Iron Cross 1st Class
- Pour le Mérite (25 August 1915)

Military offices
Preceded by New creation	Commander, Armee-Abteilung B 19 September 1914-3 September 1916	Succeeded by General der Infanterie Erich von Gündell
