= Erich von Gündell =

Prussian general of infantry (WW2) (1854-1924)

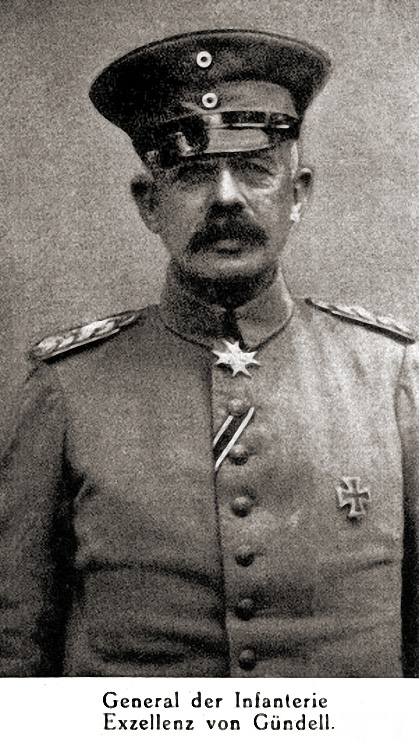

Theodor Wilhelm Gustav Erich Gündell, from 1901 named von Gündell, (13 April 1854 in Goslar – 23 December 1924 in Gottingen) was a Prussian officer, most noted as a general of infantry in World War I.

== Military career ==
Erich Gündell began his military career with the Fifth Thüringian Infantry Regiment Nr. 94 of the Prussian Army on 1 April 1873 as a cadet. he gained his ensign appointment on 15 November 1873, and was promoted to second lieutenant on 15 October 1874. He was appointed Adjutant to the First Battalion and held the post from 5 November 1876 to 31 May 1881. On 1 October 1881, he was assigned to attend further training at the War College in Berlin and graduated on 21 July 1884. During this time he received a promotion to first lieutenant on 17 October 1883. Upon completion he returned to the Fifth Thüringian Infantry Regiment Nr. 94. Gündell was transferred to the General Staff on 1 April 1887 and was promoted to captain on 22 March 1888. He served in various units as a general staff officer until his promotion to lieutenant colonel on 9 July 1900, and was appointed to the General Staff of the East Asian Expedition Corps.

For his achievements, Kaiser Wilhelm II elevated Erich Gündell with Prussian hereditary peerage on 28 November 1901 with the official title of "von" added to his name.

The East Asian Expedition Corps was dissolved and upon his return Gündell returned to the General Staff on 5 November 1901. He was then sent to the staff of 1st Army Corps, where he was appointed Chief of Staff on 14 November 1902. On 22 April 1902, he was promoted to colonel. Gündell's next position was Commander of the "Prince Louis Ferdinand of Prussia" (2nd Magdeburgisches) Infantry Regiment Nr. 27 in Halberstadt (Saxony) on 24 April 1904. He was promoted on 22 February 1906 to brigadier general and assigned as a Senior Quartermaster for the General Staff. His next promotion came on 14 June 1906 to major general. During the Second Hague Peace Conference in 1907, Gündell was the military delegate. Besides his work in the General Staff, he was also a member of the Academic Board of the Institute of War from 26 September 1908.

Von Gündell's next promotion came on 27 October 1910 to lieutenant general. He was assigned back to commanding troops with the 20th Division as commander. Three years later he handed the command over to his successor Alwin Schmundt. His next assignment was Director of the Kriegsakademie (War Academy) in Berlin. On 4 September 1913 he was promoted to General of Infantry, and handed in his resignation, which was accepted.

== World War ==
With the outbreak of World War I, von Gündell was recalled back to active service and appointed Commanding General of the V Reserve Corps. His Reserve Corps was assigned to the Fifth Army and fought at the Battle of the Ardennes, and during the siege of Verdun. Gündell received an active commission with his previous rank on 2 September 1914. In February 1916 his Corps went from trench warfare around Verdun to the offensive. His unit suffered heavy losses during the battle at Fort Vaux and its surrounding village, and eventually had to withdraw from the front in mid-June. It was transferred to Champagne for refitting. For the fighting at Verdun, von Gündell was recognized and awarded the Pour le Mérite on 28 August 1916.

On 3 September 1916, Gündell was transferred to Army Detachment B as Commander in Upper Alsace. He held this position until the end of the war. In October 1918, he was appointed as General Headquarter Chairman of the Ceasefire Commission of the Supreme Command in Spa. However, the negotiations were transferred to a civilian, Matthias Erzberger, a Center Party politician and State Secretary.

After the Armistice of Compiegne on 11 November 1918 and the demobilization of the German Army, Gündell's orders for discharge came on 23 December 1918.

== Family ==
Erich von Gündell was married. He had a son, Walter, who also pursued an officer career and rose to the rank of lieutenant general in the Second World War.

== Awards ==
- Pour le Mérite.

Other awards

- Roter Adlerorden II. Klasse mit dem Stern, Eichenlaub und Schwertern am Ringe (Order of the Red Eagle Order II Class with the star, oak leaves and swords on ring)
- Kronenorden I. Klasse (Royal Order of the Crown (Prussia) First Class)
- Preußisches Dienstauszeichnungskreuz Military Merit Cross (Prussia)
- Komtur I. Klasse des Ordens vom Zähringer Löwen (Commander First Class of the Order of the Zähringer Lion
- Bayerischer Militärverdienstorden II. Klasse mit Stern (Military Merit Order (Bavaria) Second Class with Star)
- I. Klasse des Ordens Heinrichs des Löwen (First Class of the Order of Henry the Lion)
- Offizier des Albrechts-Ordens (Officer of the Albrecht Order)
- Ritterkreuz II. Klasse des Ordens vom Weißen Falken (Knight's Cross Second Class of the Order of the White Falcon)
- Ehrenkreuz des Ordens der Württembergischen Krone mit Schwertern (Cross of Honor of the Order of the Crown (Württemberg) with Swords)
- Orden vom Doppelten Drachen Zweiter Grad I. Klasse (Order of the Double Dragon Second Grade, First Class)
- Komtur des Ordens der Aufgehenden Sonne (Commander of the Order of the Rising Sun)
- Komtur des Ordens der Heiligen Mauritius und Lazarus (Commander of the Order of Saints Maurice and Lazarus)
- Großkreuz des Franz-Joseph-Ordens (Grand Cross of the Order of Franz Joseph)
- Russischer Orden der Heiligen Anna II. Klasse (Order of St. Anna Second Class)

Military offices
Preceded by General der Infanterie Hans Gaede	Commander, Armee-Abteilung B 3 September 1916 - end 1918	Succeeded by Dissolved
