= Army Group Rupprecht of Bavaria =

Army group of the Imperial German Army

Army Group Rupprecht of Bavaria Army Group A
- Heeresgruppe Rupprecht von Bayern
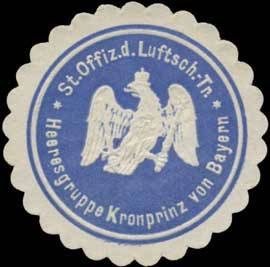
- Active: 28 August 1916 – 11 November 1918
- Country: German Empire
- Branch: German Army
- Type: Army Group
- Engagements: World War I: Battle of the Somme; Fifth Battle of Ypres

Commanders
- Supreme Commander: Rupprecht, Crown Prince of Bavaria

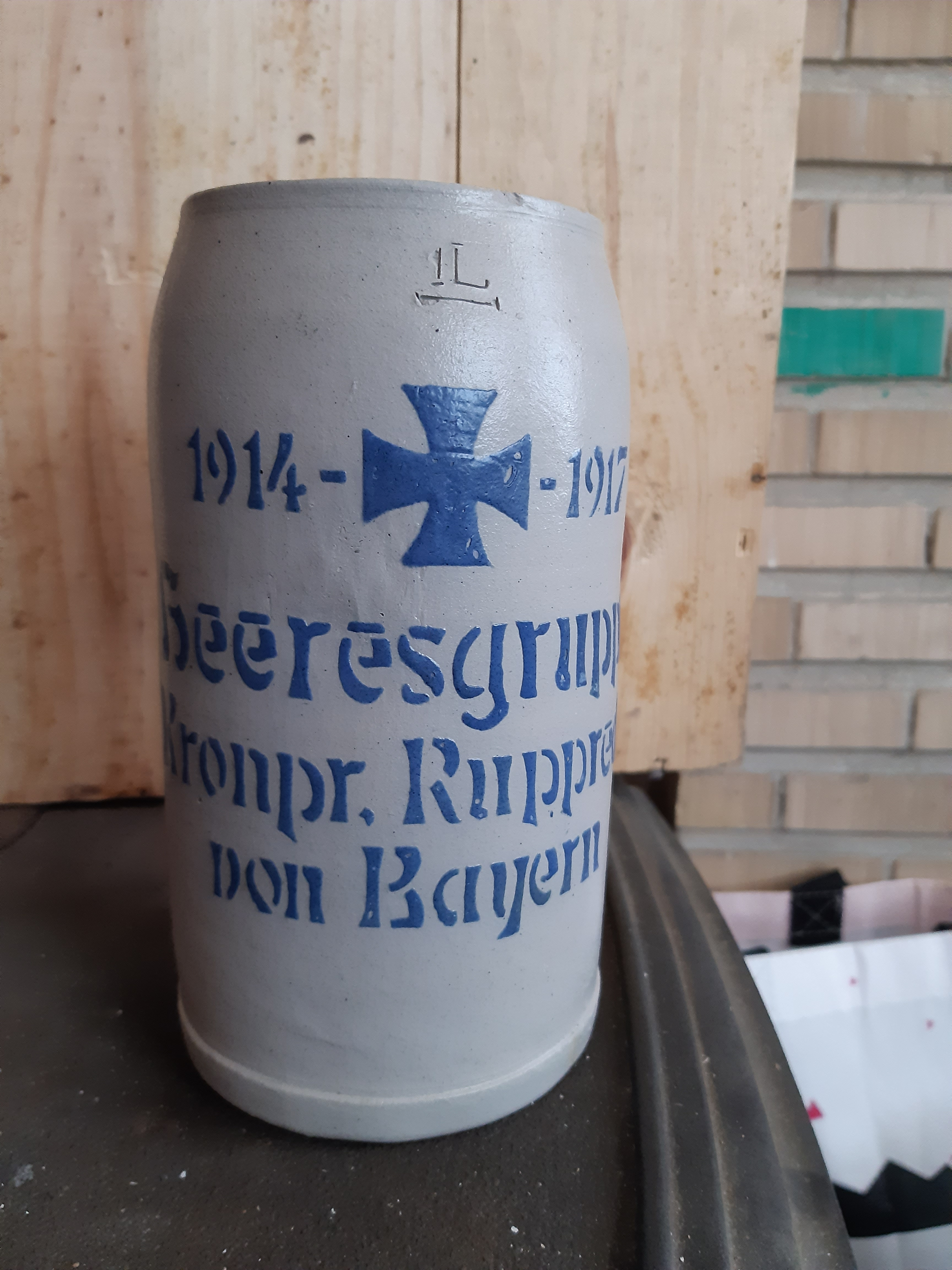
Gedänkbecher ("commemorative cup") bearing the insignia of Army Group Rupprecht of Bavaria.

The Army Group Rupprecht of Bavaria or Army Group A (German: Heeresgruppe Kronprinz Rupprecht von Bayern) was an Army Group of the German Army, which operated on the Western Front under command of Rupprecht, Crown Prince of Bavaria, between 28 August 1916 and 11 November 1918 during World War I. It was formed from the short-lived Army Group Gallwitz under Max von Gallwitz (19 July - 28 August 1916).

== History ==
At the start of the Battle of the Somme (July 1916), the German 2nd Army had grown to such an extent, that a decision was made to split it into two armies. The 1st Army was recreated on 19 July 1916 from the right (northern) wing of the 2nd Army. The new commander of the reduced 2nd Army, Max von Gallwitz, was also installed as commander of Army Group Gallwitz (Heeresgruppe Gallwitz) to co-ordinate the actions of both armies on the Somme.

On 28 August 1916, two extra armies (6th and 7th) were added to the Army Group, which was renamed Army Group Rupprecht of Bavaria, after its new commander Rupprecht, Crown Prince of Bavaria. The Army Group remained in place until the end of the war.

On 28 August 1916, Hermann von Kuhl was appointed as chief of staff of the army group.

== Composition ==
- 1st Army (Fritz von Below) : Jul 1916 – Apr 1917
- 2nd Army (Max von Gallwitz then Georg von der Marwitz then Adolph von Carlowitz) : Jul 1916 – Nov 1918
- 6th Army (Ludwig von Falkenhausen then Otto von Below then Ferdinand von Quast) : Aug 1916 – Nov 1918
- 7th Army (Richard von Schubert then Max von Boehn) : Aug 1916 – Apr 1917
- 4th Army (Friedrich Sixt von Armin) : Mar 1917 – Nov 1918
- 17th Army (Otto von Below then Bruno von Mudra) : Feb–Nov 1918

== Sources ==
- The Soldier's Burden
- Die Deutschen Heeresgruppen im Ersten Weltkrieg
- Die deutschen Heeresgruppen Teil 1, Erster Weltkrieg

== Bibliography ==
- Cron, Hermann (2002). Imperial German Army 1914–18: Organisation, Structure, Orders-of-Battle [first published: 1937]. Helion & Co. ISBN 1-874622-70-1.
