= Ernst von Below =

German general (1863–1955)

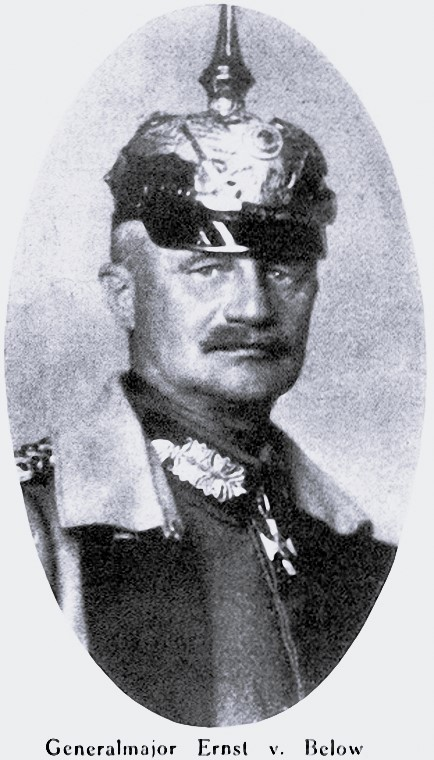
- Born: 17 April 1863; Königsberg, Kingdom of Prussia
- Died: 2 April 1955 (aged 91); Schleusingen, East Germany
- Relatives: Fritz von Below (brother); Otto von Below (cousin)
- Military career
- Allegiance: German Empire
- Branch: Imperial German Army
- Service years: 1881–1919
- Rank: Generalmajor char. General der Infanterie
- Commands: Schutztruppe; 27th Infantry Regiment; 26th Reserve Infantry Brigade; 39th Reserve Infantry Brigade; 2nd Jäger Brigade; 200th Infantry Division
- Conflicts: World War I
- Awards: Pour le merite with oak leaves

Ernst von Below was a German general who served in the Imperial German Army and participated in World War I. He also commanded several Sea Battalions and briefly headed the Schutztruppe.

== Early life and early military service ==
Ernst von Below was born on 17 April 1863 in Königsberg as the son of Prussian Generalmajor Ferdinand von Below. After being a cadet he joined the Prussian Army in 1881 as a Fähnrich, and a year later was commissioned a second lieutenant in the infantry. He entered the Prussian Staff College in 1890 and was promoted to premier lieutenant in the same year. In 1894, von Below was promoted to Hauptmann. In 1899 he was commandeered to the Infantry Training Battalion, attached to the 1st Foot Guard Regiment. Later he transferred to the 4th Guards Grenadiers as a company commander. From 1 April 1903 von Below served as an adjutant to Prince Joachim Albert of Prussia. On 6 May 1903 he was assigned as his personal adjutant and on 27 January 1904 he was promoted to major.

Von Below left the staff on 13 September 1906, when he was appointed commander of the 2nd Battalion of the 91st Infantry Regiment. On 4 April 1908 he became commander of the 2nd Sea Battalion in Wilhelmshaven, and later would lead his unit in Qingdao. He was promoted to lieutenant colonel on 20 March 1911. After his return to Germany, from 22 March 1912 von Below was in command of the 3rd Sea Battalion in Cuxhaven. On 27 January 1913 he transferred to the 1st Guard Grenadier Regiment. With his promotion to colonel on 1 October 1913, he was appointed commander of the 153rd Infantry Regiment in Altenburg. Six months later von Below moved to the Reichskolonialamt as nominal commander of the Schutztruppe.

== World War I ==
After World War I broke out von Below became commander of the 27th Infantry Regiment, and shortly later successively of the 26th and 39th Reserve Infantry brigades. In May 1915 he was chosen to lead the new 2nd Jäger Brigade. In 1917 he was promoted to Generalmajor and became the commander of 200th Infantry Division. He was awarded the prestigious Pour le Mérite on 24 November 1917, and received the oak leaves on 13 October 1918.

== Post war and death ==
After the war he got the character of a Generalleutnant. On the Tannenbergtag, the commemoration day of the Battle of Tannenberg, in 1939 he got the character of a General der Infanterie. He died in 1955 in Schleusingen.
