= 14th Army (German Empire) =

Army level command of the German Army in World War I

14. Armee; 14th Army
- Flag of the Staff of an Armee Oberkommando (1871–1918)
- Active: 9 September 1917 – 22 January 1918
- Country: German Empire
- Type: Field army
- Engagements: World War I: Battle of Caporetto; First Battle of the Piave

Insignia
- Abbreviation: A.O.K. 14

The 14th Army (German: 14. Armee / Armeeoberkommando 14 / A.O.K. 14) was an army level command of the German Army in World War I formed in September 1917 in Krainburg to assist the Austrohungarian forces in the Italian Front. Its headquarters was located at Vittorio Veneto from 10 November 1917 until the army was disbanded on 22 January 1918. The 14th Army served on the Italian Front throughout its existence.

== History ==
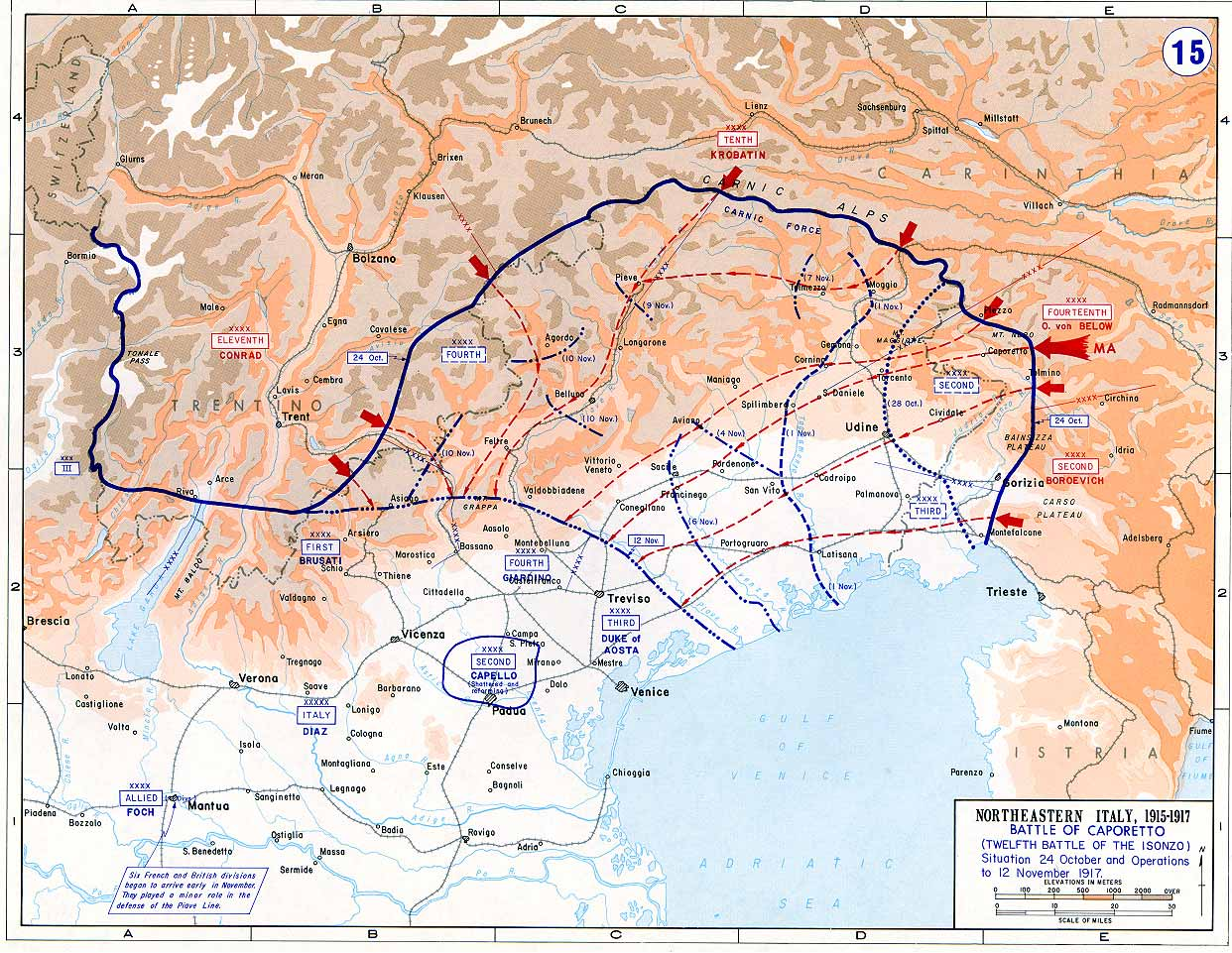
The Battle of Caporetto October/November 1917

After the Eleventh Battle of the Isonzo, the Austro-Hungarians were exhausted and could not have withstood another attack. They appealed to the Germans for help and the Germans, fearing a collapse on the Italian Front, sent 7 divisions, 540 guns, 216 mortars and about 100 aircraft from the Western and Eastern Fronts. To control these troops, a new 14th Army under General der Infanterie Otto von Below was concentrated between Tolmin and Bovec. For the Battle of Caporetto a number of Austro-Hungarian divisions were added.

Following the successful offensive, the front soon froze again in trench warfare. The German High Command decided to withdraw its forces again to use on other fronts. On 23 January 1918 the Army Command was recalled (to form a new 17th Army on the Western Front). The German troops remaining on the Italian front came under the command of 51st Corps until it was withdrawn in February 1918.

== Outline Order of Battle, Battle of Caporetto ==
Units are German unless designated as Austria-Hungary.

Organization of the 14th Army on 24 October 1917
| Army | Corps | Division |
|---|---|---|
| 14th Army | I Corps (Austria-Hungary) | 3rd "Edelweiss" Infantry Division (Austria-Hungary) |
| 14th Army | I Corps (Austria-Hungary) | 22nd Schützen Division (Austria-Hungary) |
| 14th Army | I Corps (Austria-Hungary) | 55th Infantry Division (Austria-Hungary) |
| 14th Army | I Corps (Austria-Hungary) | Jäger Division |
| 14th Army | III Bavarian Corps | 50th Infantry Division (Austria-Hungary) |
| 14th Army | III Bavarian Corps | 12th Division |
| 14th Army | III Bavarian Corps | 117th Division |
| 14th Army | III Bavarian Corps | Alpenkorps |
| 14th Army | 51st Corps | 26th Division (1st Württemberg) |
| 14th Army | 51st Corps | 200th Division |
| 14th Army | XV Corps (Austria-Hungary) | 1st Infantry Division (Austria-Hungary) |
| 14th Army | XV Corps (Austria-Hungary) | 5th Division |
| 14th Army | Army Reserve | 4th Infantry Division (Austria-Hungary) |
| 14th Army | Army Reserve | 13th Schützen Division (Austria-Hungary) |
| 14th Army | Army Reserve | 33rd Infantry Division (Austria-Hungary) |
| 14th Army | Later reinforcements | 35th Infantry Division (Austria-Hungary) |
| 14th Army | Later reinforcements | 94th Infantry Division (Austria-Hungary) |

== Commanders ==
The 14th Army was commanded throughout its existence by General der Infanterie Otto von Below, former commander of 6th Army. On dissolution of 14th Army, von Below was transferred to command of the newly raised 17th Army on the Western Front.

== See also ==
- 14th Army (Wehrmacht) for the equivalent formation in World War II

== Bibliography ==
- Cron, Hermann (2002). Imperial German Army 1914–18: Organisation, Structure, Orders-of-Battle [first published: 1937]. Helion & Co. ISBN 1-874622-70-1.
- Ellis, John; Cox, Michael (1993). The World War I Databook. Aurum Press Ltd. ISBN 1-85410-766-6.
