= Hermann von Kuhl =

German army general

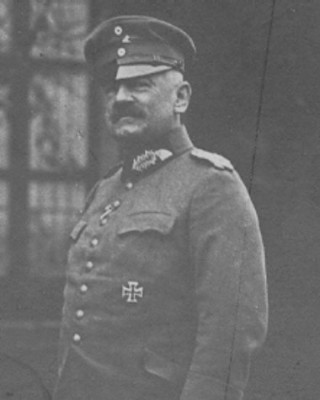
- Kuhl in 1914
- Born: 2 November 1856; Koblenz, Kingdom of Prussia
- Died: 4 November 1958 (aged 102); Frankfurt am Main, West Germany
- Military career
- Allegiance: Prussia; German Empire; Weimar Republic
- Branch: Prussian Army
- Service years: 1878–1919
- Rank: General der Infanterie
- Commands: Chief of Staff: 1st Army; 12th Army; 6th Army; Army Group "Kronprinz Rupprecht"; Army Group A
- Conflicts: World War I: Battle of the Marne (1914); Battle of the Somme (1916); Battle of Passchendaele (1917); Battle of Messines; Battle of Pilckem Ridge; Battle of the Menin Road Ridge; Battle of Broodseinde
- Awards: Pour le Mérite with Oakleaves (1916); Military Order of Max Joseph (1916); Order of the Red Eagle (1918); Pour le Mérite f. Wiss. u. Künste (1924)
- Other work: Author, Military historian

Hermann Josef von Kuhl (2 November 1856 – 4 November 1958) was a Prussian military officer, member of the German General Staff, and a Generalleutnant during World War I. One of the most competent commanders in the German Army, he retired in 1919 to write a number of critically acclaimed essays on the war. Hermann von Kuhl is one of only three recipients to be distinguished with both the "military class" and "peace class" of the Pour le Mérite, Prussia's and Germany's highest honor.

== Pre-war period ==
Hermann Kuhl was born in Koblenz, Rheinpreußen (Rhenish Prussia), the son of a professor of philosophy at the Jülich Progymnasium. He studied philosophy, classical philology, German studies and comparative linguistics at the Universities of Leipzig, Tübingen, Marburg and Berlin. In 1878, he received his D.Phil. from Tübingen magna cum laude with the dissertation De Saliorum Carminibus. During his studies, he was a member of the University of Leipzig's singing group St. Pauli.

On 1 October 1878, he joined the 5th Westphalian Infantry Regiment No. 53 – Köln as a cadet. He was promoted to Leutnant in 1879 and Oberleutnant in 1889 when he competed in the entrance examination for the Prussian Military Academy where he studied from 1889 to 1892. Winning appointment to the General Staff he was seconded to the Staff for six months before becoming a company commander in Grenadier Regiment Nr. 3 in Königsberg East Prussia.

Finally in 1897, he returned to the Prussian Military Academy in Berlin as an instructor and concurrently served as a member of the Third Department of the General Staff, which monitored France, Britain, and the Low Countries. The intelligence from this department was essential for the development of Feldmarschall Alfred Graf von Schlieffen's Plan. Kuhl's career flourished because he met the high standards of the demanding Schlieffen, who predicted that he would become a "great captain of the future". In 1899, he was promoted to Major and married. He learned much participating in Schleiffen's staff rides and war games. After Schlieffen's retirement Kuhl became head of the Third Department and was promoted to lieutenant colonel and then colonel. His first major publication, on Bonaparte's Campaign of 1796, appeared in 1902.

Further promotion depended on further command experience, so the new Chief of the General Staff Helmuth von Moltke persuaded the Kaiser's War Cabinet to appoint him to command the 25th Infantry Brigade Münster. A day later, on 4 June 1912 Kuhl was promoted to Generalmajor. A year later during the 25th anniversary celebration of the reign of Kaiser Wilhelm II he was knighted and thereby became von Kuhl. On 1 January 1914, he returned to the General Staff as an Oberquartiermeister.

== World War I ==
At the outbreak of World War I on 2 August 1914, von Kuhl became Chief of Staff in General Alexander von Kluck's First Army which was the crucial right flank of the swinging door in the Schlieffen Plan. Kluck regarded him as

a notable man, of most energetic character and wide views. Mentally and physically he was imperturbable, and, in addition to an extremely cultivated mind, he possessed a personal bravery on the battlefield which from time to time evoked a caution from the Army Commander.

By adroit staff planning they squeezed their 320,000 men through a 10 km (6.2 mi) strip of land between Liege and the Dutch border. Pivoting down into France they swept back the British Expeditionary Force. Shortly thereafter they had reached the Marne River and were transferring men to their right flank to fend off a French thrust from Paris. With the tip of the Eiffel Tower on the horizon, they were sure that "complete victory beckoned" Nonetheless they were ordered to retreat because of concern about the gap between their right flank and the German Second Army. Kuhl always maintained that the retreat was a disastrous, unnecessary failure of nerve. He was promoted to Generalleutnant on 18 April 1915. On 22 September in that same year, he became chief of staff in General Max von Fabeck's Twelfth Army, which was shifted to the Eastern Front. Next starting on 24 November 1915 he served in the same capacity in the Sixth Army on the Western Front, which was commanded by General Crown Prince Rupprecht of Bavaria. Rupprecht's prewar career was in the Bavarian Army. For exemplary service during the Battle of the Somme Kuhl received the Pour le Mérite on 28 August 1916.

At the end of August 1916 Rupprecht was given command of Army Group Crown Prince Rupprecht (German: Heeresgruppe "Kronprinz Rupprecht) with Kuhl as chief of staff. Rupprecht was one of four senior members of German royal families who were appointed army group commanders; he was regarded as difficult: according to Chief of the General Staff Erich von Falkenhayn: "One minute he is extraordinarily optimistic, the next terribly down.", which made Kuhl especially important. The Army Group was responsible for the Ypres Salient; their major challenge was to funnel in the reserves to counter the British attacks. Kuhl received the Kingdom of Bavaria's highest purely military honor, the Military Order of Max Joseph, on 13 December 1916. By then Field Marshal Paul von Hindenburg and General Erich Ludendorff had taken command. In 1917 the Germans again fought bitter defensive battles in the west, while in the east they drove the Russians out of the war.

Hence at the beginning of 1918 they outnumbered their opponents in the west and they were determined to attack for victory. Kuhl's proposal for an attack on the vital British railroads in Flanders was accepted, but while waiting for the ground to dry there, in March 1918 they smashed through the southern British front near Cambrai, using troops from the two armies on the southern flank of Army Group Rupprecht. Their success was so overwhelming that they extended the attack, but failed to separate the French and British armies and depleted resources intended for Flanders. When they did attack there they smashed through the British and Portuguese lines, but were stopped short of their strategic goal. To drain allied reserves from Flanders, the Germans shifted direction to hit the French in the south, once again shredding through their opponents lines, but failing to smash their will to resist. The Germans were about to attack again in Flanders so Kuhl, Rupprecht and their artillery commanders were meeting with Ludendorff to finalize the plans for the opening barrage when they learned by telephone that a joint French and American assault had shredded the German flank in the south. As Rupprecht wrote in his diary "no doubt we have passed the high point of this year's achievements". They all realized that they lacked the resources for continuing their attacks, so they went on the defensive.

After their defeat at the Battle of Amiens on 11 August 1918, Rupprecht and his staff recognized that Germany's position had become hopeless. Their headquarters had moved to Tournai (24 April 1918), now they retreated to Mons (2 September 1918) and finally to Brussels (17 October 1918), reflecting the long withdrawal from the Western Front and the final collapse of the German Army. Rupprecht resigned his post on 11 November 1918. For the march back to Germany, the Army Group was designated "A" (German: Heeresgruppe A) and Kuhl was made General der Infanterie to oversee its orderly demobilization. Following this final military assignment, he retired.

== Post-war period ==
In retirement, von Kuhl published books and numerous essays, articles and reviews about leadership problems on the Western Front during the war. He discussed the Schlieffen Plan in 1920, in an article written for general readers entitled Why did the Marne Campaign Fail? This sparked a debate concerning German strategy that continued throughout the 1920s and early 1930s, and again in the 1950s. Perhaps his most popular book in its day was The German General Staff in the Preparation and Conduct of the World War (1920), republished several times. He also wrote an essay The World War in the Judgment of our Enemies (1922). He was a member of the commission to oversee the publication of the official German history of the war. A string of notable works was capped in 1929 when he published Weltkrieg 1914–1918, two extensive volumes covering the entire war, which firmly established his reputation as a historian.

In the 1920s von Kuhl was appointed to the Historical Commission of the Reich Archives and gave evidence to the Weimar Republic's Parliamentary inquiries on the reasons for the military collapse of 1918. In his testimony, von Kuhl concluded

The German offensive of spring 1918 had to battle with severe challenges... The mobility of the army was limited. Front-line units were gradually exhausted, while the enemy's combat power grew substantially through the arrival of the Americans and through the new means of combat – the tank.

This stands in contrast to General Erich Ludendorff who spent his post-war years promoting a stab-in-the-back legend that blamed the German defeat without an honorable peace on Marxists and Republicans at home. Military historian Hans Meier-Welcker summed up von Kuhl this way

For a deep historical understanding of the world war, even if not free of temporal apology, he performed a significant contribution.

For his postwar work, von Kuhl was awarded the Pour le Mérite für Wissenschaften und Künste (English: Order of Merit in the Sciences and Arts) in 1924, Germany's highest civilian decoration. Hermann von Kuhl spent his last few years living with his nephew in Frankfurt am Main. He died there on 4 November 1958 at the age of 102.

In an obituary, German historian Gerhard Ritter called him "the last of the officers of the old imperial army who had already held a senior command in 1914".

== Awards ==
- Pour le Mérite, 28 August 1916 (one of the few recipients of both the "military class" and the "civil class")
- Oak leaves to the Pour le Mérite, 20 December 1916
- Commander of the Military Order of Max Joseph (Bavaria, 13 December 1916)
- Order of the Red Eagle, Knight 2nd Class with Oak Leaves and Swords, 12 January 1918
- Order of the Crown, 1st class with Swords (Prussia, 22 March 1918)
- Pour le Mérite for Sciences and Arts for his historical studies (5 December 1924)
- Naming of a street in Koblenz: Von-Kuhl-Straße

== Dates of ranks ==
- Fähnrich—1 October 1878
- Leutnant—12 January 1879
- Oberleutnant—16 February 1889
- Hauptmann—14 September 1892
- Major—13 September 1899
- Oberstleutnant—10 April 1906
- Oberst—24 March 1909
- Generalmajor—4 June 1912
- Generalleutnant—18 April 1915
- General der Infanterie—18 November 1918

== Works by von Kuhl ==
- Der deutsche Generalstab in Vorbereitung und Durchführung des Weltkrieges. Mittler, Berlin 1920 (online).
- Der Marnefeldzug 1914. Mittler, Berlin 1921 (online).
- Ursachen des Zusammenbruchs: Entstehung, Durchführung und Zusammenbruch der Offensive von 1918. Hobbing, Berlin 1923.
- "Unity of Command Among the Central Powers" in: Foreign Affairs September, 1923 (online) at foreignaffairs.com
- Der Weltkrieg 1914–1918. Dem deutschen Volke dargestellt. 2 Bände. Tradition W. Kolk, Berlin 1929.
- with General [Walter Friedrich Adolf] von Bergmann, Movements and Supply of the German First Army During August and September, 1914 (Fort Leavenworth: Command and General Staff School Press, 1929). (Online).

== Literature ==
- Hans Meier-Welcker: "General der Infanterie v. Kuhl 96 Jahre alt". In: Wehrwissenschaftlche Rundschau. Band 2, 1952, Heft 11, p. 550.

Military offices
Preceded by ?	Commander, 25. Infantry Brigade Münster; 3 June 1913 – 2 August 1914	Succeeded by ?
Preceded by Formed from VIII Army Inspectorate (VIII. Armee-Inspektion)	Chief of Staff, 1st Army; 2 August 1914 – 21 September 1914	Succeeded by ?
Preceded by ?	Chief of Staff, 12th Army; 22 September 1915 – 23 November 1915	Succeeded by ?
Preceded by ?	Chief of Staff, 6th Army; 24 November 1915 – 27 August 1916	Succeeded by ?
Preceded by ?	Chief of Staff; Army Group Kronprinz Rupprecht; 24 November 1915 – 11 November 1918	Succeeded by Dissolved
Preceded by Formed from Army Group; Kronprinz Rupprecht	General der Infanterie; Army Group A 12 November 1918 – 11 January 1919	Succeeded by Dissolved
