= 17th Army (German Empire) =

17. Armee; 17th Army
- Flag of the staff of an Armee Oberkommando (1871–1918)
- Active: 1 February 1918 – 19 January 1919
- Country: German Empire
- Type: Army
- Engagements: World War I Narew Offensive Spring Offensive Operation Michael

Insignia
- Abbreviation: A.O.K. 17

The 17th Army (German: 17. Armee / Armeeoberkommando 17 / A.O.K. 17) was an army-level command of the German Army in World War I. It was formed in France on 1 February 1918 from the former 14th Army command. It served exclusively on the Western Front and was dissolved on 19 January 1919.

== History ==
17th Army was one of three armies (along with 18th Army and 19th Army) formed in late 1917 / early 1918 with forces withdrawn from the Eastern Front. They were in place to take part in Ludendorff's German spring offensive. The Germans had realised that their only remaining chance of victory was to defeat the Allies before the overwhelming human and matériel resources of the United States could be deployed. They also had the temporary advantage in numbers afforded by nearly 50 divisions freed by Russia's withdrawing from the war (Treaty of Brest-Litovsk).

At the end of the war it was part of Heeresgruppe Kronprinz Rupprecht.

The Headquarters was at St Amand until 6 April 1918, Douai until 1 May 1918, Denain until 18 October 1918 and Mons until start of the march back, reaching Zülpich for disbandment on 19 January 1919.

=== Order of Battle, 30 October 1918 ===
By the end of the war, the 17th Army was organised as:

Organization of 17th Army on 30 October 1918
Army	Corps	Division
17th Army	I Bavarian Reserve Corps	187th Division
17th Army	I Bavarian Reserve Corps	26th Reserve Division
17th Army	I Bavarian Reserve Corps	10th Ersatz Division
17th Army	I Bavarian Reserve Corps	208th Division
17th Army	II Bavarian Corps	234th Division
17th Army	II Bavarian Corps	25th Division
17th Army	XVIII Corps	220th Division
17th Army	XVIII Corps	35th Division
17th Army	XVIII Corps	6th Division
17th Army	XIV Reserve Corps	214th Division
17th Army	XIV Reserve Corps	111th Division
17th Army	XIV Reserve Corps	48th Reserve Division
17th Army	XIV Reserve Corps	206th Division
17th Army	XIV Reserve Corps	12th Division
17th Army	XIV Reserve Corps	28th Reserve Division

== Commanders ==
17th Army had the following commanders:

17th Army
From	Commander	Previously	Subsequently,
1 February 1918	General der Infanterie Otto von Below	14th Army	1st Army
12 October 1918	General der Infanterie Bruno von Mudra	1st Army	

== Glossary ==
- Armee-Abteilung or army detachment in the sense of "something detached from an army". It is not under the command of an army so is in itself a small army.
- Armee-Gruppe or army group in the sense of a group within an army and under its command, generally formed as a temporary measure for a specific task.
- Heeresgruppe or army group in the sense of a number of armies under a single commander.

== See also ==
- 17th Army (Wehrmacht) for the equivalent formation in World War II
- German Army order of battle, Western Front (1918)

== Bibliography ==
- Cron, Hermann (2002). Imperial German Army 1914–18: Organisation, Structure, Orders-of-Battle [first published: 1937]. Helion & Co. ISBN 1-874622-70-1.
- Ellis, John; Cox, Michael (1993). The World War I Databook. Aurum Press Ltd. ISBN 1-85410-766-6.
