= Fritz von Below =

Prussian general in the German Army during the First World War

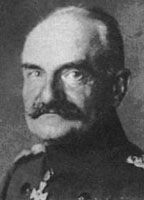
- Born: 23 September 1853; Danzig, Province of Prussia, Kingdom of Prussia, German Confederation
- Died: 23 November 1918 (aged 65); Weimar, Free State of Saxe-Weimar-Eisenach, Weimar Republic
- Relatives: General Ernst von Below (brother); Otto von Below (cousin)
- Military career
- Allegiance: Kingdom of Prussia; German Empire
- Branch: Prussian Army; Imperial German Army
- Service years: 1873–1918
- Rank: General der Infanterie
- Commands: 3rd (Queen Elizabeth) Guards Grenadiers; 4th Guards Infantry Brigade; 1st Guards Infantry Division; XXI Corps; 2nd Army; 1st Army; 9th Army
- Conflicts: World War I; Second Masurian Lakes; Battle of the Somme; Second Battle of the Aisne
- Awards: Pour le Mérite with Oakleaves

Fritz Theodor Carl von Below (23 September 1853 – 23 November 1918) was a Prussian general in the German Army during the First World War. He commanded troops during the Battle of the Somme, the Second Battle of the Aisne, and the German spring offensive in 1918.

== Biography ==
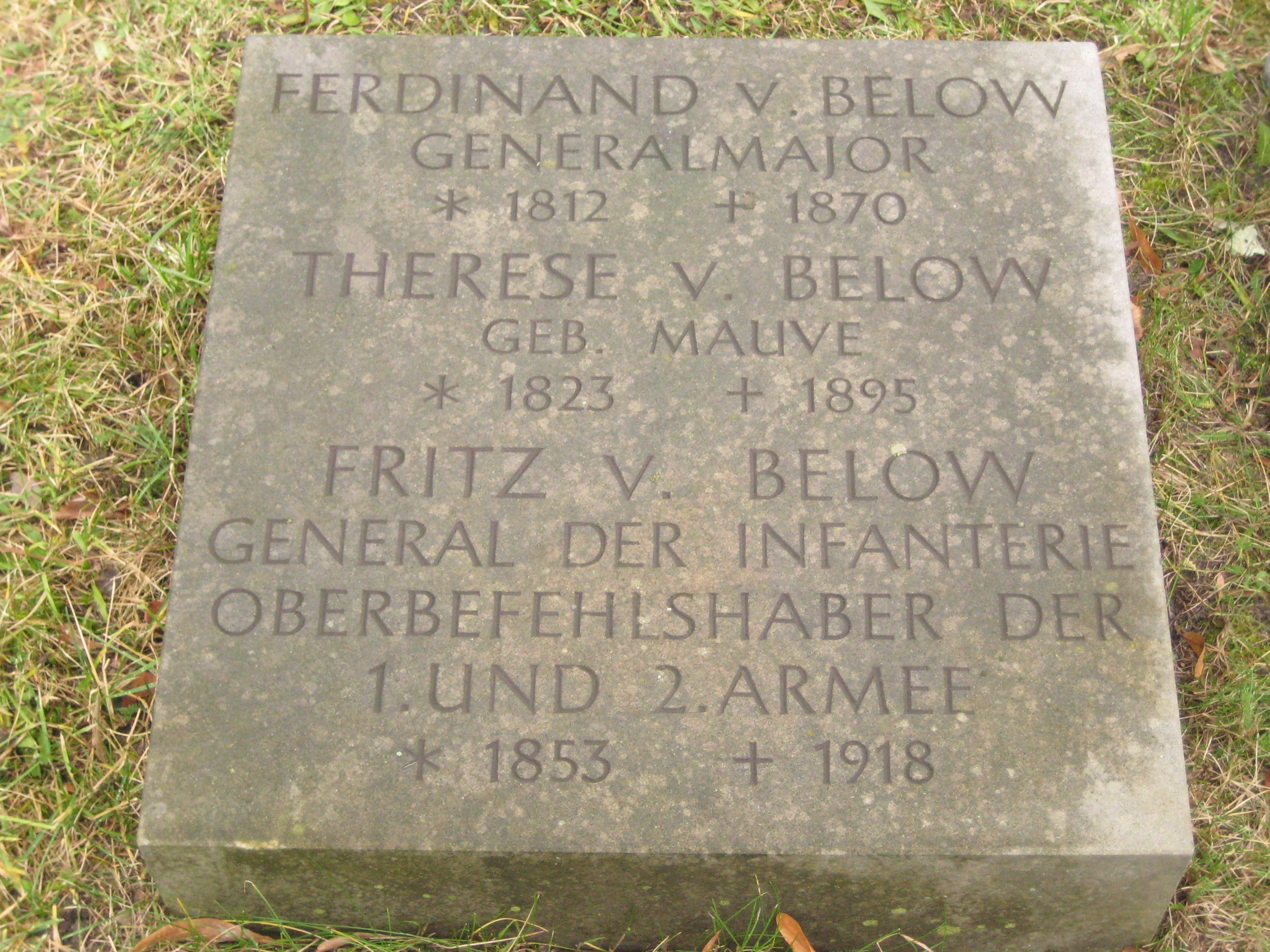
Below's tomb at Berlin Invalidenfriedhof Cemetery

Born in Danzig (West Prussia), von Below, the son of Prussian Major General Ferdinand Adolf Eduard von Below (1812–1870), attended the Prussian Cadet Corps and was transferred to the 1st Foot Guards (German Empire) on 19 April 1873 as a 2nd Lieutenant due to his excellent achievements as a cadet.

He was appointed to the command of XXI Corps in 1912. In this capacity, he fought along with the 6th Army on the Western Front at the beginning of World War I. His corps was transferred in 1915 to the Eastern Front where it participated in the Second Battle of the Masurian Lakes. Below was awarded the Pour le Mérite on 16 February 1915 for successful campaigns on the Western Front and in the Second Battle of the Masurian Lakes.

Von Below was elevated to command of the 2nd Army on 4 April 1915. In 1916 the 2nd Army bore the brunt of the Allied attack in the Battle of the Somme. Reinforcements increased the size of the 2nd Army to such an extent that a decision was made to split it. The 1st Army was reformed on 19 July 1916 from the right (northern) wing of the 2nd Army. Below took command of 1st Army and 2nd Army got a new commander General der Artillerie Max von Gallwitz, who was also installed as commander of armeegruppe Gallwitz-Somme to co-ordinate the actions of both armies. Below was awarded the Oakleaves to the Pour le Mérite (signifying a second award) on 11 August 1916 for his success in operations during the Battle of the Somme.

Von Below was appointed to command the 9th Army in June 1918, still on the Western Front. He had contracted pneumonia and its former commander, General der Infanterie Johannes von Eben, remained in provisional command.

Fritz von Below died in Weimar on 23 November 1918, shortly after Germany had signed the armistice. He is buried in the Invalidenfriedhof Cemetery in Berlin.

== Family ==
Von Below was the cousin of Otto von Below, another German commander during the war. The two generals are often confused. His brother Nikolaus Friedrich Wilhelm Ferdinand (1855–1915) was a Major General of the Prussian Army, another brother was General der Infanterie Ernst von Below (1863–1955)

== Glossary ==
- Armee-Abteilung or Army Detachment in the sense of "something detached from an Army". It is not under the command of an Army.
- Armee-Gruppe a group within an Army and under its command, generally formed as a temporary measure for a task.
- Heeresgruppe or Army Group in the sense of a number of armies under one commander.

== See also ==
- List of people from Danzig

== Bibliography ==
- Cron, Hermann (2002) [1937]. Imperial German Army 1914–18: Organisation, Structure, Orders-of-Battle. Helion & Co. ISBN 1-874622-70-1.

Military offices
| Preceded by Helmuth von Moltke the Younger | Quartermaster-General of the German Army; 13 February 1906 – 22 February 1906 | Succeeded by Erich von Gündell |
| Preceded by New Formation | Commander, XXI Corps; 1 October 1912 – 4 April 1915 | Succeeded by Generalleutnant Oskar von Hutier |
| Preceded by Generalfeldmarschall Karl von Bülow | Commander, 2nd Army; 4 April 1915 – 19 July 1916 | Succeeded by General der Artillerie Max von Gallwitz |
| Preceded by General der Infanterie Max von Fabeck | Commander, 1st Army; 19 July 1916 – 9 June 1918 | Succeeded by General der Infanterie Bruno von Mudra |
| Preceded by General der Infanterie Johannes von Eben | Commander, 9th Army; 9 June 1918 – 6 August 1918 | Succeeded by General der Infanterie Adolph von Carlowitz |
