= 6th Army (German Empire) =

WW1 German Army formation

6. Armee; 6th Army
- Flag of the Staff of an Armee Oberkommando (1871–1918)
- Active: 2 August 1914 – 29 January 1919
- Country: German Empire
- Branch: Imperial German Army
- Type: Army
- Engagements: World War I: Western Front; Battle of the Frontiers; Battle of Lorraine; Battle of Grand Couronné; Race to the Sea; Battle of Albert (1914); Battle of Arras (1914); First Battle of Ypres; Battle of Festubert; Third Battle of Artois; Battle of Arras (1917); Battle of Hill 70; Battle of Vimy Ridge; Spring Offensive; Battle of the Lys (1918)

Insignia
- Abbreviation: A.O.K. 6

The 6th Army (German: 6. Armee / Armeeoberkommando 6 / A.O.K. 6) was an army level command of the German Army in World War I. It was formed on mobilization in August 1914 from the IV Army Inspectorate. The army was disbanded in 1919 during demobilization after the war.

== History ==
At the outbreak of World War I, command of the army was given to Rupprecht, Crown Prince of Bavaria (Kronprinz Rupprecht von Bayern). The 6th Army initially consisted of the units of the Bavarian Army (which had retained military sovereignty after the unification of Germany), with some additional Prussian units. During the execution of Plan XVII, the 6th Army was stationed in the Central sector, covering Lorraine.

In August 1914, in the Battle of Lorraine, Rupprecht's 6th Army managed to hold against the French offensive, using a feigned withdrawal to lure the advancing armies onto prepared defensive positions.

After the Western Front turned to stalemate and the opposing forces formed lines of trenches, the 6th Army was based in Northern France. Most of the Bavarian units were gradually dispersed to other commands, with units from outside Bavaria joining the 6th Army. Nevertheless, command of the 6th Army remained with the Bavarian Crown Prince, who would eventually come to be regarded as one of Germany's most able generals.

On 24 September 1915 the 6th Army was the target for the British Army's first chlorine gas attack of the war. Despite the horrific casualties inflicted, the British offensive became bogged down after several days.

Rupprecht was promoted to the rank of field marshal (Generalfeldmarschall) in July 1916 and assumed command of Army Group Rupprecht on 28 August that year, consisting of the 1st, 2nd, 6th and 7th Armies. Following Rupprecht's promotion, command of the 6th Army was given to General Ludwig von Falkenhausen.

In March 1917 the 6th Army was the target for the assault of the Canadian and British forces at the Battle of Vimy Ridge. The 6th Army under von Falkenhausen suffered over 20,000 casualties in the ensuing fighting and were pushed back from the ridge by the Canadian Corps.

At the end of the war it was serving as part of Heeresgruppe Kronprinz Rupprecht.

=== Order of Battle, August 1914, Lorraine ===
For the Battle of Lorraine in August 1914, the 6th Army had the following composition:

Organization of the 6th Army – August 1914, Lorraine
Army	Corps	Division
6th Army	XXI Corps	31st Division
6th Army	XXI Corps	42nd Division
6th Army	I Bavarian Corps	1st Bavarian Division
6th Army	I Bavarian Corps	2nd Bavarian Division
6th Army	II Bavarian Corps	3rd Bavarian Division
6th Army	II Bavarian Corps	4th Bavarian Division
6th Army	III Bavarian Corps	5th Bavarian Division
6th Army	III Bavarian Corps	6th Bavarian Division
6th Army	I Bavarian Reserve Corps	1st Bavarian Reserve Division
6th Army	I Bavarian Reserve Corps	5th Bavarian Reserve Division
6th Army	Under direct Army command	1st Bavarian Foot Artillery Brigade
6th Army	Under direct Army command	6th Pioneer General
6th Army	Under direct Army command	5th Bavarian Mixed Landwehr Brigade

=== Order of Battle, 30 October 1918 ===
By the end of the war, the 6th Army was organised as:

Organization of 6th Army on 30 October 1918
Army	Corps	Division
6th Army	55th Corps (z.b.V.)	38th Division
6th Army	55th Corps (z.b.V.)	12th Bavarian Division
6th Army	55th Corps (z.b.V.)	5th Bavarian Division
6th Army	55th Corps (z.b.V.)	two thirds 4th Ersatz Division
6th Army	55th Corps (z.b.V.)	9th Reserve Division
6th Army	IV Corps	2nd Guards Reserve Division
6th Army	IV Corps	one third 4th Ersatz Division
6th Army	IV Corps	36th Division
6th Army	XXXX Reserve Corps	16th Division
6th Army	XXXX Reserve Corps	8th Division
6th Army	XI Corps	No units assigned

== Commanders ==
The 6th Army had the following commanders during its existence.

6th Army
From	Commander	Previously	Subsequently
2 August 1914	Generaloberst Rupprecht, Crown Prince of Bavaria	IV Army Inspectorate (IV. Armee-Inspektion)	Heeresgruppe Rupprecht
23 July 1916	Generalfeldmarschall Rupprecht of Bavaria	IV Army Inspectorate (IV. Armee-Inspektion)	Heeresgruppe Rupprecht
28 August 1916	Generaloberst Ludwig von Falkenhausen	High Command of Coastal Defence	Governor General of Belgium
23 April 1917	General der Infanterie Otto von Below	Heeresgruppe Below	14th Army
9 September 1917	General der Infanterie Ferdinand von Quast	Guards Corps	

== Glossary ==
- Armee-Abteilung or Army Detachment in the sense of "something detached from an Army". It is not under the command of an Army so is in itself a small Army.
- Armee-Gruppe or Army Group in the sense of a group within an Army and under its command, generally formed as a temporary measure for a specific task.
- Heeresgruppe or Army Group in the sense of a number of armies under a single commander.

== See also ==
- 6th Army (Wehrmacht) for the equivalent formation in World War II
- German Army order of battle (1914)
- German Army order of battle, Western Front (1918)
- Schlieffen Plan

== Bibliography ==
- Cron, Hermann (2002). Imperial German Army 1914–18: Organisation, Structure, Orders-of-Battle [first published: 1937]. Helion & Co. ISBN 1-874622-70-1.
- Ellis, John; Cox, Michael (1993). The World War I Databook. Aurum Press Ltd. ISBN 1-85410-766-6.
