= 200th Infantry Division (German Empire) =

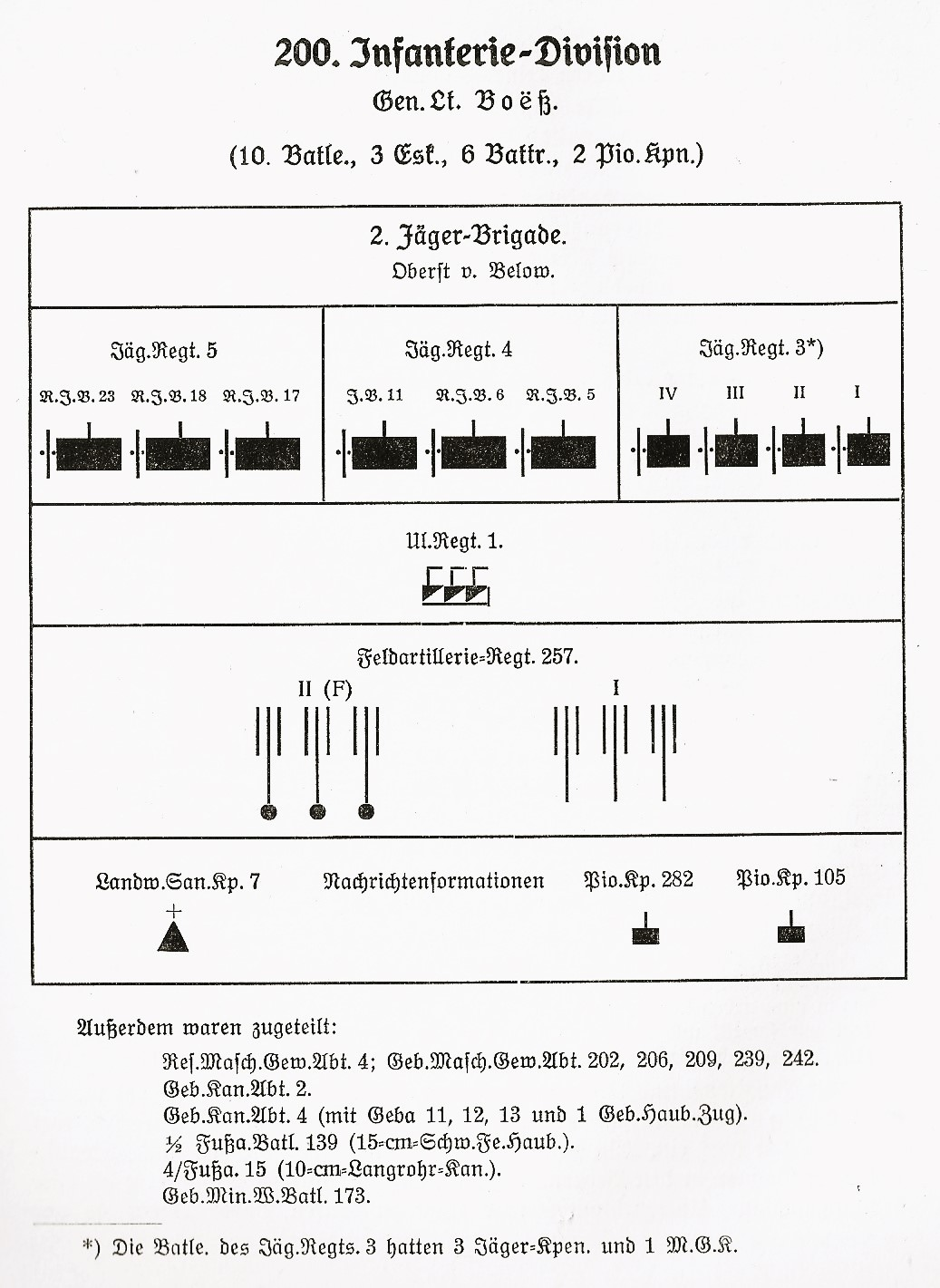
- Allegiance: German Empire
- Branch: Imperial German Army
- Engagements: World War I

Commanders
- Notable commanders: Ernst von Below

The 200th Infantry Division (200. Infanterie-Division) was a formation of the Imperial German Army in World War I.
