= Bruno von Mudra =

Prussian officer and General of Infantry

- Born: 1 April 1851; Bad Muskau, Kingdom of Prussia
- Died: 21 November 1931 (aged 80); Zippendorf, Germany
- Military career
- Allegiance: Prussia; German Empire
- Branch: Imperial German Army
- Service years: 1870–1919
- Rank: General of Infantry
- Commands: Guards Pioneer Battalion; Engineer and Pioneer Corps; 7th (1st Westphalian) Pioneer Battalion; 39th Division; XVI Corps; 8th Army; Armee-Abteilung A; 1st Army; 17th Army
- Conflicts: Franco-Prussian War; World War I
- Awards: Pour le Mérite with Oak Leaves

Karl Bruno Julius Mudra, from 1913 von Mudra (1 April 1851, in Bad Muskau – 21 November 1931, in Zippendorf) was a Prussian officer, and later General of Infantry during World War I. He was a recipient of Pour le Mérite with Oak Leaves. Mudra married on 12 October 1886 in Rheydt Paula Schött (* 26 June 1860 in Rheydt – † 22 November 1937 in Schwerin), daughter of Hermann Schött (owner of a big print shop) and Sofie Wilhelmine Jansen. They had two children:

- Herbert Emil Bruno (1887–1945), Colonel
- Edith (1892–1942).

== Honours ==
- Kingdom of Prussia:
  - Iron Cross II Class (1870)
  - Iron Cross I Class
  - Pour le Mérite (13 January 1915) and Oak Leaves (17 October 1916)

Military offices
Preceded by General der Infanterie Maximilian von Prittwitz	Commander, XVI Corps; 1 March 1913 – 28 October 1916	Succeeded by Generalleutnant Adolf Wild von Hohenborn
Preceded by General der Infanterie Max von Fabeck	Commander, 8th Army; 22 October 1916 – 2 January 1917	Succeeded by General der Artillerie Friedrich von Scholtz
Preceded by General der Infanterie Karl d'Elsa	Commander, Armee-Abteilung A 4 January 1917 – 9 June 1918	Succeeded by General der Infanterie Johannes von Eben
Preceded by General der Infanterie Fritz von Below	Commander, 1st Army; 9 June – 12 October 1918	Succeeded by General der Infanterie Otto von Below
Preceded by General der Infanterie Otto von Below	Commander, 17th Army; 12 October – 1 December 1918	Succeeded by Dissolved
