= 2nd Army (German Empire) =

Military unit of the German Army in World War I

2. Armee; 2nd Army
- Flag of the Staff of an Armee Oberkommando (1871–1918)
- Active: 2 August 1914 – 13 January 1919
- Country: German Empire
- Type: Army
- Engagements: World War I

Insignia
- Abbreviation: A.O.K. 2

The 2nd Army (German: 2. Armee / Armeeoberkommando 2 / A.O.K. 2) was an army level command of the German Army in World War I. It was formed on mobilization in August 1914 from the III Army Inspection. The army was disbanded in 1919 during demobilization after the war.

== History ==
The 2nd Army during World War I, fought on the Western Front and took part in the Schlieffen Plan offensive against France and Belgium in August 1914. Commanded by General Karl von Bülow, the 2nd Army's mission was to support the 1st Army's sweep around the left flank of the French Army and encircle Paris, bringing a rapid conclusion to the war. The 2nd Army laid siege to, and took the Belgian fortresses around Namur, and fought General Charles Lanrezac's French 5th Army at the Battle of Charleroi on 23–24 August 1914 and again at St. Quentin on 29–30 August 1914.

2nd Army bore the brunt of the Allied attack in the Battle of the Somme. It had grown to such an extent that a decision was made to split it into two still-powerful armies. Therefore, 1st Army was reformed on 19 July 1916 from the right (northern) wing of the 2nd Army. The former commander of 2nd Army, General der Infanterie Fritz von Below, took command of 1st Army and 2nd Army got a new commander General der Artillerie Max von Gallwitz. Von Gallwitz was also installed as commander of Heeresgruppe Gallwitz – Somme to co-ordinate the actions of both armies on the Somme.

A large proportion of the Army would be wiped out during the joint Anglo-French offensive on the Somme.

At the end of the war it was serving as part of Heeresgruppe Kronprinz Rupprecht.

=== Order of Battle, 30 October 1918 ===
By the end of the war, the 2nd Army was organised as:

Organization of 2nd Army on 30 October 1918
Army	Corps	Division
2nd Army	54th Corps (z.b.V.)	21st Reserve Division
2nd Army	54th Corps (z.b.V.)	22nd Division
2nd Army	54th Corps (z.b.V.)	4th Division
2nd Army	54th Corps (z.b.V.)	113th Division
2nd Army	54th Corps (z.b.V.)	239th Division
2nd Army	54th Corps (z.b.V.)	12th Reserve Division
2nd Army	54th Corps (z.b.V.)	Jäger Division
2nd Army	54th Corps (z.b.V.)	185th Division
2nd Army	IV Reserve Corps	14th Division
2nd Army	IV Reserve Corps	58th Division
2nd Army	IV Reserve Corps	18th Reserve Division
2nd Army	IV Reserve Corps	30th Division
2nd Army	IV Reserve Corps	44th Reserve Division
2nd Army	51st Corps (z.b.V.)	2nd Cyclist Brigade
2nd Army	51st Corps (z.b.V.)	243rd Division
2nd Army	51st Corps (z.b.V.)	121st Division
2nd Army	51st Corps (z.b.V.)	54th Division
2nd Army	51st Corps (z.b.V.)	1st Guards Reserve Division
2nd Army	51st Corps (z.b.V.)	22nd Reserve Division
2nd Army	Under Army command	17th Reserve Division

== Commanders ==
The 2nd Army had the following commanders during its existence.

2nd Army
From	Commander	Previously	Subsequently,
2 August 1914	Generaloberst Karl von Bülow	III Army Inspectorate (III. Armee-Inspektion)	Heart attack, retired
27 January 1915	Generalfeldmarschall Karl von Bülow	III Army Inspectorate (III. Armee-Inspektion)	Heart attack, retired
4 April 1915	General der Infanterie Fritz von Below	XXI Corps	1st Army
19 July 1916	General der Artillerie Max von Gallwitz	Attack Group West	5th Army
17 December 1916	General der Kavallerie Georg von der Marwitz	VI Corps	5th Army
22 September 1918	General der Infanterie Adolph von Carlowitz	9th Army	

== Glossary ==
- Armee-Abteilung or Army Detachment in the sense of "something detached from an Army". It is not under the command of an Army so is in itself a small Army.
- Armee-Gruppe or Army Group in the sense of a group within an Army and under its command, generally formed as a temporary measure for a specific task.
- Heeresgruppe or Army Group in the sense of a number of armies under a single commander.

== See also ==
- 2nd Army (Wehrmacht) for the equivalent formation in World War II
- German Army order of battle (1914)
- German Army order of battle, Western Front (1918)
- Schlieffen Plan

== Bibliography ==
- Cron, Hermann (2002). Imperial German Army 1914–18: Organisation, Structure, Orders-of-Battle [first published: 1937]. Helion & Co. ISBN 1-874622-70-1.
- Ellis, John; Cox, Michael (1993). The World War I Databook. Aurum Press Ltd. ISBN 1-85410-766-6.
