= Ferdinand von Quast =

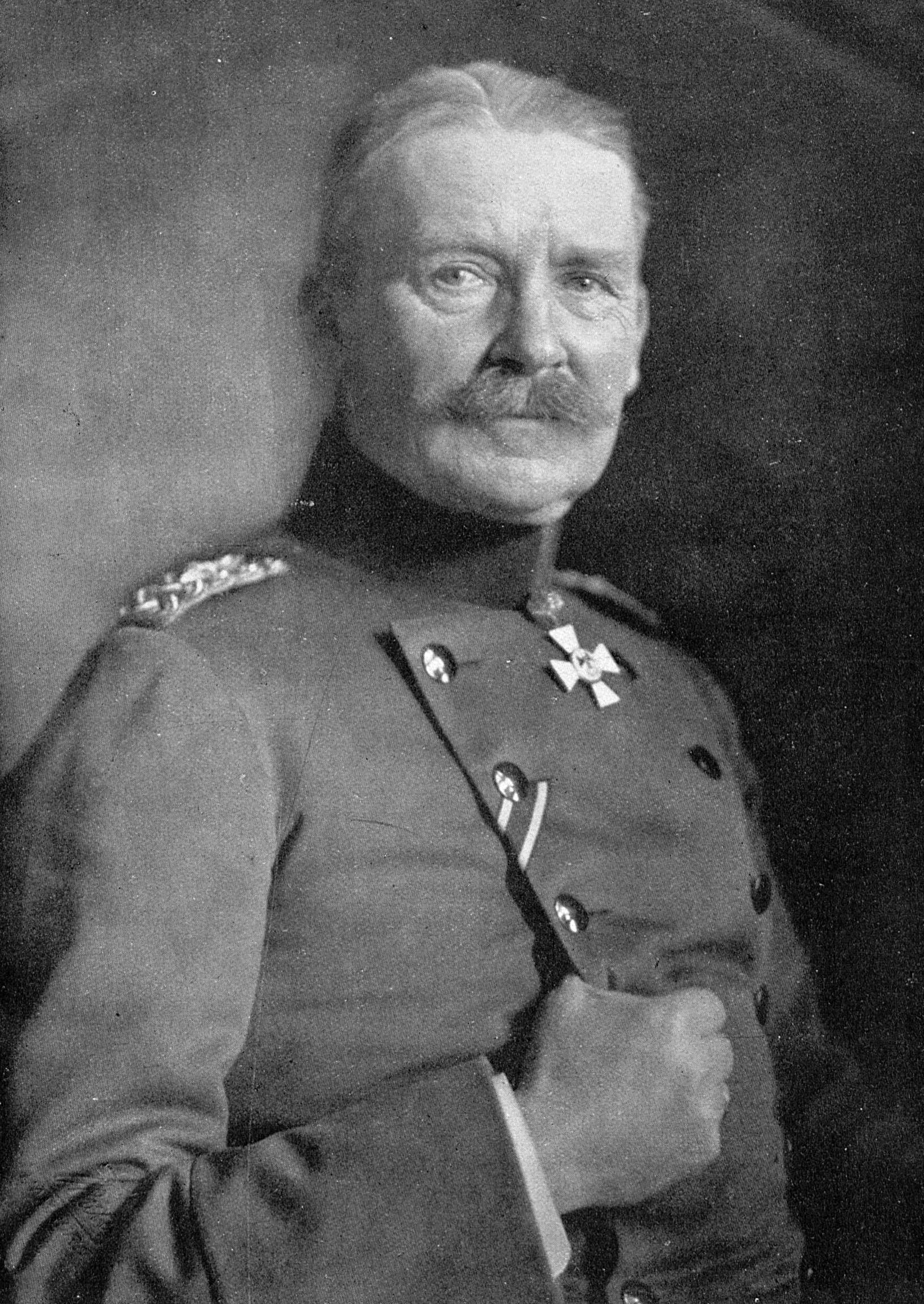
- Born: 18 October 1850; Radensleben; Brandenburg, Kingdom of Prussia
- Died: 27 March 1939 (aged 88); Potsdam; Brandenburg, Nazi Germany
- Military career
- Allegiance: Prussia; German Empire
- Branch: Prussian Army
- Service years: 1870–1919
- Rank: General der Infanterie
- Commands: 2nd Regiment of Guards Grenadiers; 39th Infantry Brigade; 3rd Guards Infantry Brigade; 2nd Guards Infantry Brigade; 36th Infantry Division; 6th Infantry Division; IX Corps; Guards Corps; 6th Army; A.O.K. North
- Conflicts: Franco-Prussian War; World War I
- Awards: Order of the Red Eagle; Pour le Merite with Oak Leaves

Alexander Ferdinand Ludolf von Quast (18 October 1850 – 27 March 1939) was a Prussian military officer, participant in the Franco-Prussian War and a general in the First World War. He commanded the German 6th Army during the Battle of the Lys of the Spring Offensive in 1918.

== Family ==
Quast stemmed from a family of old Anhalt nobility. He was the son of the Prussian state conservator-restorer Ferdinand von Quast and his wife Maria, née von Diest (1818–17 August 1885). Her father was Prussian Lieutenant General Heinrich von Diest. On 21 June 1877 Quast married Alexandrine Freiin von Paykull.

== Career ==
On 19 July 1870 he joined the 2nd (Emperor Francis) Regiment of Guards Grenadiers and fought with it in the Franco-Prussian War. On 12 January 1871 Quast was promoted to Sekondeleutnant and received the Iron Cross 2nd Class. On 23 September 1879 he was promoted to Premierleutnant. 1887 followed a promotion to Hauptmann, and in 1894 he was made a Major and assigned as battalion-commander in the 2nd Guards Infantry. In 1901 von Quast was promoted to Oberstleutnant and assigned to the staff of 1st (Emperor Alexander) Guards Grenadiers before becoming commander of his old 2nd Guards Grenadiers with the rank of Oberst on 18 April 1903.

As General-major he took command of the 39th Infantry Brigade at Hannover on 21 May 1907. The following year he was at first assigned as commander of the 3rd Guards Infantry Brigade in Berlin, then assigned to the 2nd Guard Infantry Brigade in Potsdam. On 27 July 1910 Quast was tasked with the command of the 36th Infantry Division in Gdańsk. Shortly afterwards he was promoted to Generalleutnant and given command of the 6th Infantry Division in Brandenburg City. In March 1913 Quast was named commanding general of the IX Corps in Altona, Hamburg.

== First World War ==
Fighting in the Battle of Tirlemont (Hautem-Sainte-Marguerite), von Quast was promoted to General der Infanterie on 19 August 1914. In 1916 he participated in the Battle of the Somme where he and his corps were positioned in the southern sector near Péronne. His stern defensive and his organizatorial skills were noticed and he received the Pour le Merite from the hand of Emperor Wilhelm II on 11 August. In January 1917 Quast was assigned to lead the prestigious Guards Corps, a command he held until September when he was named commander of the 6th Army. On 10 April 1918 he was awarded the oak leaves to his Pour le Merite.

== After the war ==
After the fighting ended, and with the demobilisation of the high command, von Quast relinquished his command and was put in the leadership reserve. On 18 January 1919 he was assigned command of Grenzschutz-Armeeoberkommando Nord (literally Border Protection – Army High Command North) as part of the Provisional Reichswehr at Königsberg. After the Treaty of Versailles was signed von Quast requested his retirement and finally retired on 7 July 1919. He died in Potsdam.

== Honours ==
He received the following decorations and awards:

- Kingdom of Prussia:
  - Knight of the Red Eagle, 2nd Class with Oak Leaves and Star
  - Knight of the Prussian Crown, 1st Class
  - Iron Cross (1870), 2nd Class, 12 August 1871
  - Knight of Justice of the Johanniter Order
  - Pour le Merite (military), 11 August 1916; with Oak Leaves, 10 April 1918
- Baden: Grand Cross of the Zähringer Lion, with Oak Leaves, 1902
- Schaumburg-Lippe: Cross of Honour of the House Order of Schaumburg-Lippe, 3rd Class
- Persian Empire: Order of the Lion and the Sun, 3rd Class
- Kingdom of Italy: Commander of the Crown of Italy
- Austria-Hungary:
  - Knight of the Imperial Order of Leopold, 1889
  - Knight of the Iron Crown, 3rd Class, 1903
  - Grand Cross of the Order of Franz Joseph, 1907
- Spain: Knight of the Military Merit Order, 3rd Class
- Sweden: Commander of the Sword, 1st Class, 1908
- Ottoman Empire: Order of the Medjidie, 2nd Class
- Kingdom of Saxony: Commander of the Military Order of St. Henry, 2nd Class, 7 May 1918

Military offices
Preceded by Otto von Below	Commander, 6th Army; 9 September 1917 – January 1919	Succeeded by Dissolved
