= Otto von Below =

Prussian military officer

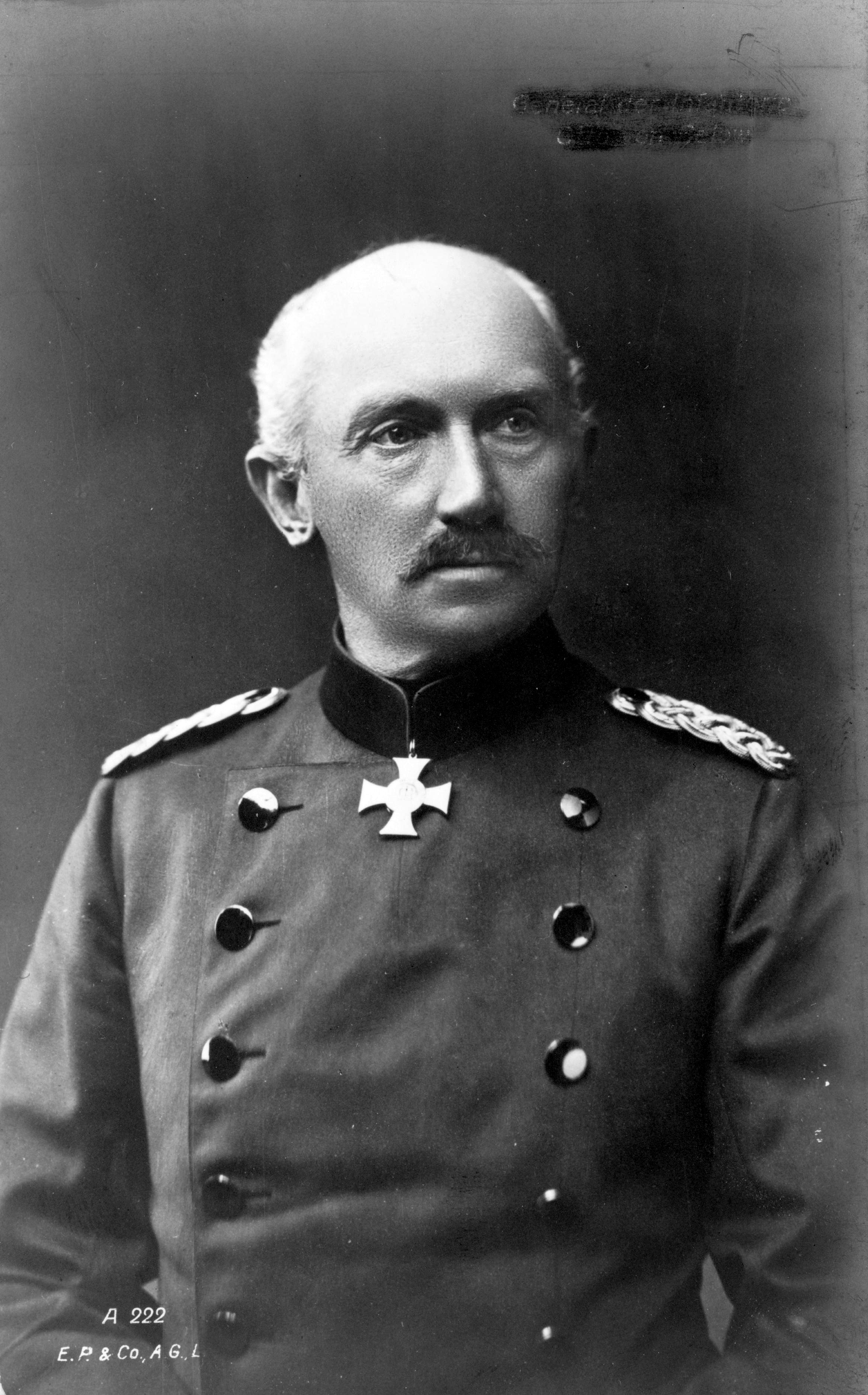
- Born: 18 January 1857; Danzig, Kingdom of Prussia, German Confederation
- Died: 9 March 1944 (aged 87); Besenhausen near Göttingen, Nazi Germany
- Military career
- Allegiance: German Empire: Kingdom of Prussia
- Branch: Imperial German Army; Prussian Army
- Service years: 1875–1919
- Rank: General der Infanterie
- Commands: 19th (2nd Posen) Infantry; 43rd Infantry Brigade; 2nd Infantry Division; I Reserve Corps; 8th Army; Army of the Niemen; Heeresgruppe Below; 6th Army; 14th Army; 17th Army; 1st Army; Home Defense Forces West
- Conflicts: World War I; Eastern Front; Gumbinnen; Tannenberg; 1st Masurian Lakes; 2nd Masurian Lakes; Macedonian Front; Monastir Offensive; Italian Campaign; Battle of Caporetto; Western Front; Operation Michael
- Awards: Pour le Mérite with Oakleaves

Otto Ernst Vinzent Leo von Below (18 January 1857 – 9 March 1944) served as a Prussian general officer in the Imperial German Army during the First World War (1914–1918). (Note: In German personal names, von is a preposition which approximately means 'of' or 'from' and usually denotes some sort of nobility. While von (always lower case) is part of the family name or territorial designation, not a first or middle name, if the noble is referred to by their last name, use Schiller, Clausewitz or Goethe, not von Schiller, etc.) He arguably became most notable for his command, along with the Austro-Hungarian commander Svetozar Borojević, during the victorious Battle of Caporetto in October–November 1917.

== Pre-war ==
Von Below was born in Danzig (now Gdańsk). He was promoted Generalmajor in 1909 and Generalleutnant in 1912. Since April 1912, he was commanding the 2nd Infantry Division.

== First World War ==
=== Eastern Front ===
On 1 August 1914, at the outbreak of the First World War, Below was given command of I Reserve Corps as part of 8th Army on the Eastern Front. He led his Corps in the Battles of Gumbinnen, Tannenberg, and the Masurian Lakes. As a result of his successes, he was promoted to General der Infanterie at the end of August 1914 and to command of 8th Army at the beginning of November 1914.

Below commanded the 8th Army in the Second Battle of the Masurian Lakes (February 1915) and the Army of the Niemen (later renamed 8th Army) in the Courland Offensive (May 1915). His forces advanced into Courland and Lithuania as far as the southern reaches of the Western Dvina River.

=== Macedonia ===
In October 1916, Below was appointed to the command of Heeresgruppe Below on the Macedonian Front, consisting of the German 11th Army and the First & Second Bulgarian Armies. In April 1917, he was briefly sent to the Western Front to command 6th Army around Lille.

=== Italy ===
Below next served on the Italian Front from September 1917. Commanding the Austro-German 14th Army (seven German and ten Austro-Hungarian divisions) in the Battle of Caporetto, his units were able to break into the Italian front line and rout the Italian army, which had practically no mobile reserves. The battle was a demonstration of the effectiveness of the use of stormtroopers and the infiltration tactics developed in part by Oskar von Hutier. The use of poison gas by Germans troops played a key role in the collapse of the Italian Second Army. A breakdown in German logistics brought the battle to a close on the line of the Piave River and the front soon froze again in trench warfare.

=== Western Front ===
In February 1918, Below was brought back to the Western Front to command the new 17th Army for the Kaiserschlacht Offensive. Below was expected to overrun Arras during March 1918 in a repeat of Caporetto; his inability to do so led to the failure of the German campaign to capture the Somme that same month. Attacking the stronger, better prepared British Third Army, he had less success than forces further south facing the British Fifth Army.

In January 1918, he made the following revolutionary proposal to Ludendorff: "Forget about the offensive and shorten the front lines as much as necessary; build Panzers throughout all of 1918 and, with your Panzer squadrons, break through all the way to the Channel coast in the Spring of 1919". Below briefly commanded the 1st Army. Shortly before the war's end, Below was involved in preparations for a possible final battle on German territory (Home Defense Forces West).

== Awards ==
Below was awarded the Pour le Mérite on 16 February 1915 "for outstanding leadership and distinguished military planning and successful operations", and the Oakleaves (signifying a second award) on 27 April 1917. Below was also awarded the Order of the Black Eagle on 1 November 1917 and the Iron Cross, 1st and 2nd class.

== Post-war ==
Below retired in 1919. A post-war attempt by the Allies to try him as a war criminal failed. Otto von Below died on 9 March 1944 in Besenhausen near Göttingen.

== Family ==
Below was a cousin of Fritz von Below, another German commander during the war. The two Generals are often confused.

== Bibliography ==
- Cron, Hermann (2002) [1937]. Imperial German Army 1914–18: Organisation, Structure, Orders-of-Battle. Helion & Co. ISBN 1-874622-70-1.
- Seth, Ronald (1965). Caporetto: The Scapegoat Battle. Macdonald.

Military offices
Preceded by New Formation	Commander, I Reserve Corps; 2 August 1914 – 7 November 1914	Succeeded by Generalleutnant Kurt von Morgen
Preceded by General der Infanterie Hermann von François	Commander, 8th Army; 7 November 1914 – 26 May 1915	Succeeded by General der Artillerie Friedrich von Scholtz
Preceded by New Formation	Commander, Army of the Niemen; 26 May – 30 December 1915	Succeeded by renamed 8th Army
Preceded by Army of the Niemen renamed	Commander, 8th Army; 30 December 1915 – 5 October 1916	Succeeded by General der Infanterie Max von Fabeck
Preceded by Generalfeldmarschall August von Mackensen	Commander, Army Group Below; 11 October 1916 – 20 April 1917	Succeeded by General der Artillerie Friedrich von Scholtz
Preceded by Generaloberst Ludwig von Falkenhausen	Commander, 6th Army; 23 April 1917 – 9 September 1917	Succeeded by General der Infanterie Ferdinand von Quast
Preceded by New Formation	Commander, 14th Army; 9 September 1917 – 22 January 1918	Succeeded by Dissolved, became 17th Army
Preceded by Formed from 14th Army	Commander, 17th Army; 1 February 1918 – 12 October 1918	Succeeded by General der Infanterie Bruno von Mudra
Preceded by General der Infanterie Bruno von Mudra	Commander, 1st Army; 12 October 1918 – 8 November 1918	Succeeded by General der Infanterie Magnus von Eberhardt
