= 1st Army (German Empire) =

Military unit of the German Army in World War I

1. Armee; 1st Army
- Flag of the Staff of an Armee Oberkommando (1871–1918)
- Active: 2 August 1914 – 17 September 1915; 19 July 1916 – 24 January 1919
- Country: German Empire
- Type: Army
- Engagements: World War I Battle of the Frontiers Siege of Antwerp (part) Battle of Mons Battle of Le Cateau First Battle of the Marne First Battle of the Aisne Battle of Arras (1914) Battle of the Somme Second Battle of the Aisne

Insignia
- Abbreviation: A.O.K. 1

The 1st Army (German: 1. Armee / Armeeoberkommando 1 / A.O.K. 1) was an army level command of the German Army in World War I. It was formed on mobilization in August 1914 from the VIII Army Inspectorate. The army was dissolved on 17 September 1915, but reformed on 19 July 1916 during the Battle of the Somme. It was finally disbanded in 1919 during demobilization after the war.

== History ==
=== First formation ===
The 1st Army during World War I, fought on the Western Front and took part in the Schlieffen Plan offensive against France and Belgium in August 1914. Commanded by General Alexander von Kluck, the 1st Army's job was to command the extreme right of the German forces in attacking the left flank of the French Army and encircling Paris, bringing a rapid conclusion to the war. His army had the greatest striking power of the offensive, a density of about 18,000 men per mile of front (about 10 per metre). The First Army captured Brussels on 20 August and was almost successful in defeating France but was halted just 13 miles outside the French capital in the First Battle of the Marne that took place in early September. Von Kluck was replaced in 1915 after being seriously wounded in the leg.

With 10 army level commands (1st to 7th Armies plus three Armee-Abteilungen), the German Supreme Command felt able to dispense with 1st Army. Its units were distributed amongst neighbouring armies and the army was dissolved on 17 September 1915.

=== Second formation ===
2nd Army bore the brunt of the Allied attack in the Battle of the Somme. It had grown to such an extent that a decision was made to divide it. The 1st Army was reformed on 19 July 1916 from the right (northern) wing of the 2nd Army. The former commander of 2nd Army, General der Infanterie Fritz von Below, took command of 1st Army and 2nd Army got a new commander General der Artillerie Max von Gallwitz. Von Gallwitz was also installed as commander of Heeresgruppe Gallwitz – Somme to co-ordinate the actions of both armies on the Somme.

At the end of the war it was serving as part of Heeresgruppe Deutscher Kronprinz.

=== Order of Battle, 30 October 1918 ===
By the end of the war, the 1st Army was organised as:

Organization of 1st Army on 30 October 1918
Army	Corps	Division
1st Army	VII Reserve Corps	1st Division
1st Army	VII Reserve Corps	50th Reserve Division
1st Army	VII Reserve Corps	8th Bavarian Reserve Division
1st Army	VII Reserve Corps	17th Division
1st Army	VII Reserve Corps	parts of Guards Cavalry Rifle Division
1st Army	VI Reserve Corps	80th Reserve Division
1st Army	VI Reserve Corps	Guards Cavalry Rifle Division (less elements)
1st Army	XXIV Reserve Corps	51st Reserve Division
1st Army	XXIV Reserve Corps	7th Division

== Commanders ==
The original 1st Army had the following commanders until it was dissolved 17 September 1915:

1st Army
From	Commander	Previously	Subsequently,
2 August 1914	Generaloberst Alexander von Kluck	VIII Army Inspectorate (VIII. Armee-Inspektion)	Wounded, 27 March 1915
28 March 1915	General der Infanterie Max von Fabeck	11th Army	12th Army

A "new" 1st Army was formed from the right (northern) wing of the 2nd Army during the Battle of the Somme.

"New" 1st Army
From	Commander	Previously	Subsequently,
19 July 1916	General der Infanterie Fritz von Below	2nd Army	9th Army
9 June 1918	General der Infanterie Bruno von Mudra	Armee-Abteilung A	17th Army
12 October 1918	General der Infanterie Otto von Below	17th Army	Homeland Defence West
8 November 1918	General der Infanterie Magnus von Eberhardt	7th Army	

== Glossary ==
- Armee-Abteilung or Army Detachment in the sense of "something detached from an Army". It is not under the command of an Army so is in itself a small Army.
- Armee-Gruppe or Army Group in the sense of a group within an Army and under its command, generally formed as a temporary measure for a specific task.
- Heeresgruppe or Army Group in the sense of a number of armies under a single commander.

== See also ==
- 1st Army (Wehrmacht) for the equivalent formation in World War II
- German Army order of battle (1914)
- German Army order of battle, Western Front (1918)
- Order of battle at Mons
- Order of battle, 1st Battle of the Marne
- Schlieffen Plan

== Bibliography ==
- Cron, Hermann (2002) [1937]. Imperial German Army 1914–18: Organisation, Structure, Orders-of-Battle (2nd Eng. trans. ed.). Helion. ISBN 1-874622-70-1.
- Ellis, John; Cox, Michael (1993). The World War I Databook. Aurum Press. ISBN 1-85410-766-6.
