= 7th Army (German Empire) =

7. Armee; 7th Army
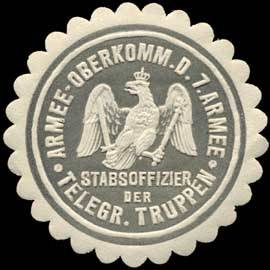
- Seal mark
- Active: 2 August 1914 – January 1919
- Country: German Empire
- Type: Field Army
- Engagements: World War I: Western Front; Battle of the Frontiers; Battle of Mulhouse; Battle of Lorraine; Nivelle Offensive; Second Battle of the Aisne; Spring Offensive; Second Battle of the Marne

Insignia
- Abbreviation: A.O.K. 7

The 7th Army (German: 7. Armee / Armeeoberkommando 7 / A.O.K. 7) was an army level command of the German Army in World War I. It was formed on mobilization in August 1914 from the II Army Inspection. The army was disbanded in 1919 during demobilization after the war.

== History ==
Formed at the outbreak of World War I, 7th Army formed the extreme left (southern) wing of the German Armies on the Western Front. During the execution of the French Plan XVII, the 7th Army covered Alsace, successfully repulsing the French attack in the Battle of Lorraine. It then took part in the Race to the Sea, an attempt by both German and Anglo-French armies to turn each other's flank.

At the end of the war it was serving as part of Heeresgruppe Deutscher Kronprinz.

=== Order of Battle, 30 October 1918 ===
By the end of the war, the 7th Army was organised as:

Organization of 7th Army on 30 October 1918
Army	Corps	Division
7th Army	XVII Corps	24th Reserve Division
7th Army	XVII Corps	86th Division
7th Army	XVII Corps	one third of 10th Reserve Division
7th Army	III Corps	one third of 10th Reserve Division
7th Army	III Corps	26th Division
7th Army	III Corps	227th Division
7th Army	III Corps	3rd Naval Division
7th Army	VIII Reserve Corps	84th Division
7th Army	VIII Reserve Corps	19th Division
7th Army	VIII Reserve Corps	2nd Bavarian Division
7th Army	VIII Reserve Corps	one third of 10th Reserve Division
7th Army	65th Corps (z.b.V.)	5th Division
7th Army	65th Corps (z.b.V.)	4th Guards Division
7th Army	65th Corps (z.b.V.)	216th Division
7th Army	65th Corps (z.b.V.)	50th Division
7th Army	VII Corps	No units assigned
7th Army	Moving to Armee-Abteilung A	24th Division

== Commanders ==
The 7th Army had the following commanders during its existence.

7th Army
From	Commander	Previously	Subsequently,
2 August 1914	Generaloberst Josias von Heeringen	II Army Inspectorate (II. Armee-Inspektion)	High Command of Coastal Defence
28 August 1916	General der Artillerie Richard von Schubert	XXVII Reserve Corps	Placed on inactive reserve status
27 January 1917	Generaloberst Richard von Schubert	XXVII Reserve Corps	Placed on inactive reserve status
11 March 1917	General der Infanterie Max von Boehn	Armee-Abteilung C	Heeresgruppe Boehn
22 March 1918	Generaloberst Max von Boehn	Armee-Abteilung C	Heeresgruppe Boehn
6 August 1918	General der Infanterie Magnus von Eberhardt	X Reserve Corps	1st Army
15 October 1918	Generaloberst Max von Boehn	Heeresgruppe Boehn	

== Glossary ==
- Armee-Abteilung or Army Detachment in the sense of "something detached from an Army". It is not under the command of an Army so is in itself a small army.
- Armee-Gruppe or Army Group in the sense of a group within an Army and under its command, generally formed as a temporary measure for a specific task.
- Heeresgruppe or Army Group in the sense of a number of armies under one commander.

== See also ==
- 7th Army (Wehrmacht) for the equivalent formation in World War II
- German Army order of battle (1914)
- German Army order of battle, Western Front (1918)
- Schlieffen Plan

== Bibliography ==
- Cron, Hermann (2002). Imperial German Army 1914–18: Organisation, Structure, Orders-of-Battle [first published: 1937]. Helion & Co. ISBN 1-874622-70-1.
- Ellis, John; Cox, Michael (1993). The World War I Databook. Aurum Press Ltd. ISBN 1-85410-766-6.
