= Gustav Adolf von Wulffen =

German military officer (1878–1945)

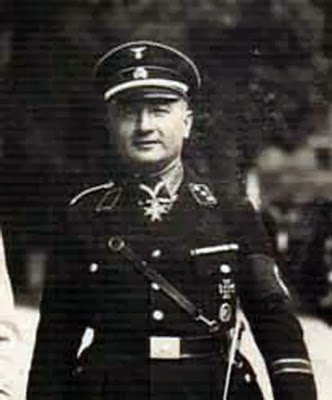
- Wulffen (c. 1933)
- Born: 18 April 1878; Gotha, Saxe-Coburg and Gotha, German Empire
- Died: 4 May 1945 (aged 67); Borkheide, Nazi Germany
- Military career
- Allegiance: German Empire; Nazi Germany
- Branch: Prussian Army; Wehrmacht
- Service years: 1897–1918; 1939–1945
- Rank: Major; Generalmajor
- Commands: Potsdam garrison
- Conflicts: World War I: Battle of Rossignol; Battle of Passchendaele; Spring Offensive; World War II: Battle of Berlin
- Awards: Pour le Mérite; Iron Cross; War Merit Cross

Gustav Adolf von Wulffen (18 April 1878 – 4 May 1945) was a highly-decorated German military officer who fought in both world wars. In the First World War, he was decorated with the highest Prussian decoration for bravery, the Pour le Mérite. In the interwar years, he joined the Nazi Party and rose to become an SS-Brigadeführer in the Allgemeine SS and a Generalmajor in the Wehrmacht. He was killed in combat in the final days before Germany's surrender in the Second World War.

== Early life and education ==
Wulffen was born on April 18, 1878, in Gotha as the son of Imperial German Army Generalleutnant, Gustav Adolf Alexander Ferdinand von Wulffen and his wife Klara Wilhelmine Christiane Hauff. He studied at the Gymnasium in Meiningen, Darmstadt and Frankfurt am Main, and was sent to the military school for boys in Potsdam in March 1891. Wulffen later attended the Preußische Hauptkadettenanstalt, the main Prussian military academy at Groß-Lichterfelde in Berlin. He graduated in March 1897 and was commissioned as a Leutnant in Infanterie-Regiment "Graf Bose" (1. Thüringisches) Nr. 31.

He was appointed battalion adjutant in his regiment in October 1902 and held this assignment until he was promoted to regimental adjutant. Wulffen was promoted to the rank of Oberleutnant in May 1907 and to Hauptmann in October 1912. He was subsequently transferred to Breslau and appointed brigade adjutant in the 22nd Infantry Brigade.

== World War I ==
On the outbreak of the First World War, Wulffen participated in combat in Belgium in August 1914 and later in France during September and October. He was transferred to Reserve-Infanterie-Regiment 271 in January 1915 and appointed commander of Feld-Battalion 26. He was transferred with his unit to the eastern front and participated in the campaign in Galicia until August 1916, when he was transferred to the staff of XXXX Reserve Corps under General of Infantry, Karl Litzmann as the corps adjutant. For his service in the early phase of the war, Wulffen was decorated with both classes of the Iron Cross.

In May 1917, Wulffen was transferred back to the western front and attached to Mecklenburgischen Grenadier-Regiments 89 as commander of II. Battalion. He led this unit during the combat in West Flanders and participated in the Battle of Passchendaele. He was decorated with the Knight's Cross of the Prussian House Order of Hohenzollern with Swords for his service in Flanders.

During the German spring offensive in early 1918, Wulffen led his battalion during the heavy combat in northern France and distinguished himself in action. He was decorated with the highest Prussian decoration for bravery, the Pour le Mérite on April 21, 1918. Wulffen also received both classes of the Mecklenburg-Schwerin Military Merit Cross.

Wulffen was transferred to the staff of Heeresgruppe Boehn under Generaloberst Max von Boehn and served as adjutant until he was promoted to the rank of Major in October 1918 and transferred to the staff of XXVI Reserve Corps under General Oskar von Watter. He remained in that capacity until the end of war and retired from the army on December 31, 1918.

== Interwar period ==
After the war, Wulffen worked as a salesman and became involved in right-wing politics by joining the Hamburger Nationalklub, a Hamburg-based group for conservative businessmen, in which he became the business manager. Around the spring of 1931, he also joined the Nazi Party (membership number 495,764) and its paramilitary unit, the Sturmabteilung (SA). In June 1933, he was one of only three men hired by the newly established Office of the Deputy Führer. He became a Party functionary with the rank of Politischer Leiter, a rank also held by his co-workers Martin Bormann and Alfred Leitgen. Wulffen was the director of personnel matters.

Wulffen transferred from the SA to the Schutzstaffel (SS) in early 1933 (membership number 72,208) and was commissioned as an SS-Sturmführer on 3 September. He eventually served on the staff of the Reichsführer-SS and attained the rank of SS-Brigadeführer on 20 April 1939.

== World War II ==
Wulffen was recalled to active military service with the army at the end of August 1939 with the temporary rank of Oberst, and was attached to the general staff in Berlin. He was subsequently transferred to the Army Ground Training Center in Zossen and held temporary command of the center for about two weeks. He was subsequently transferred to Potsdam and assumed command of the local army garrison. He was promoted to the permanent rank of Oberst in February 1941. Wulffen held this assignment for the duration of the war and was promoted to Generalmajor in March 1942.

Wulffen received both classes of the War Merit Cross with swords for his wartime service. In April 1945, He assumed command of a mixed combat group consisted of units from his garrison and other army units. He was severely wounded during combat with Allied troops and died of his wounds in a field hospital on May 4, 1945.

== Decorations ==
- Pour le Mérite: April 21, 1918
- Knight's Cross of the Prussian House Order of Hohenzollern with Swords: October 8, 1917
- Iron Cross (1914)
  - 2nd Class
  - 1st Class
- Mecklenburg-Schwerin Military Merit Cross
  - 2nd Class
  - 1st Class
- Wound Badge in Silver
- Honour Cross of the World War 1914/1918
- NSDAP Service Decoration in Bronze
- SS-Ehrenring
- War Merit Cross with Swords
  - 2nd Class: December 24, 1940
  - 1st Class: September 1, 1943

== See also ==
- List SS-Brigadeführer
