= Le Châtelet-sur-Retourne–Juniville–Vouziers railway line =

Railway line in France

Coordinates: 49.418521313914866°N 4.280110668920954°E

Châtelet-sur-Retourne–Juniville–Vouziers
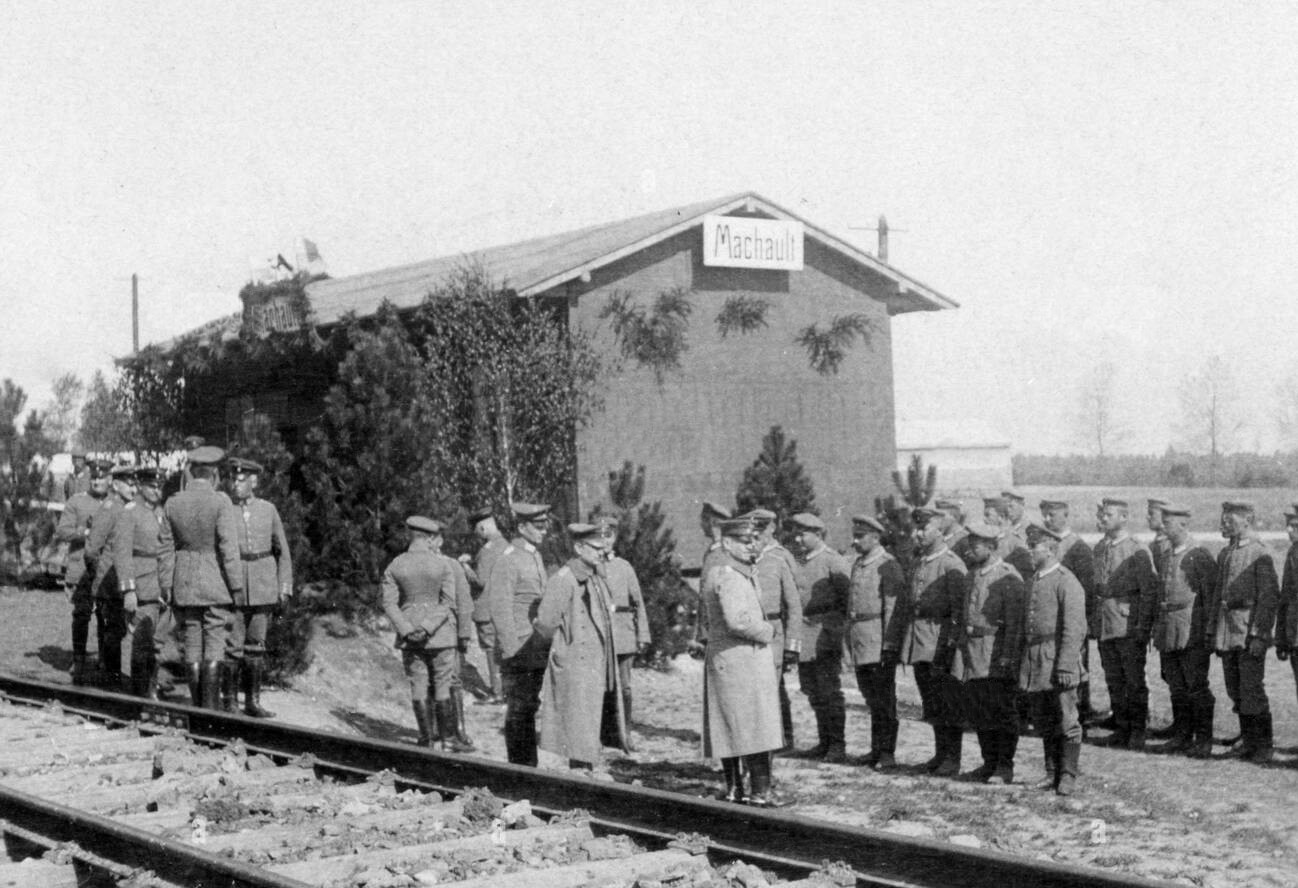
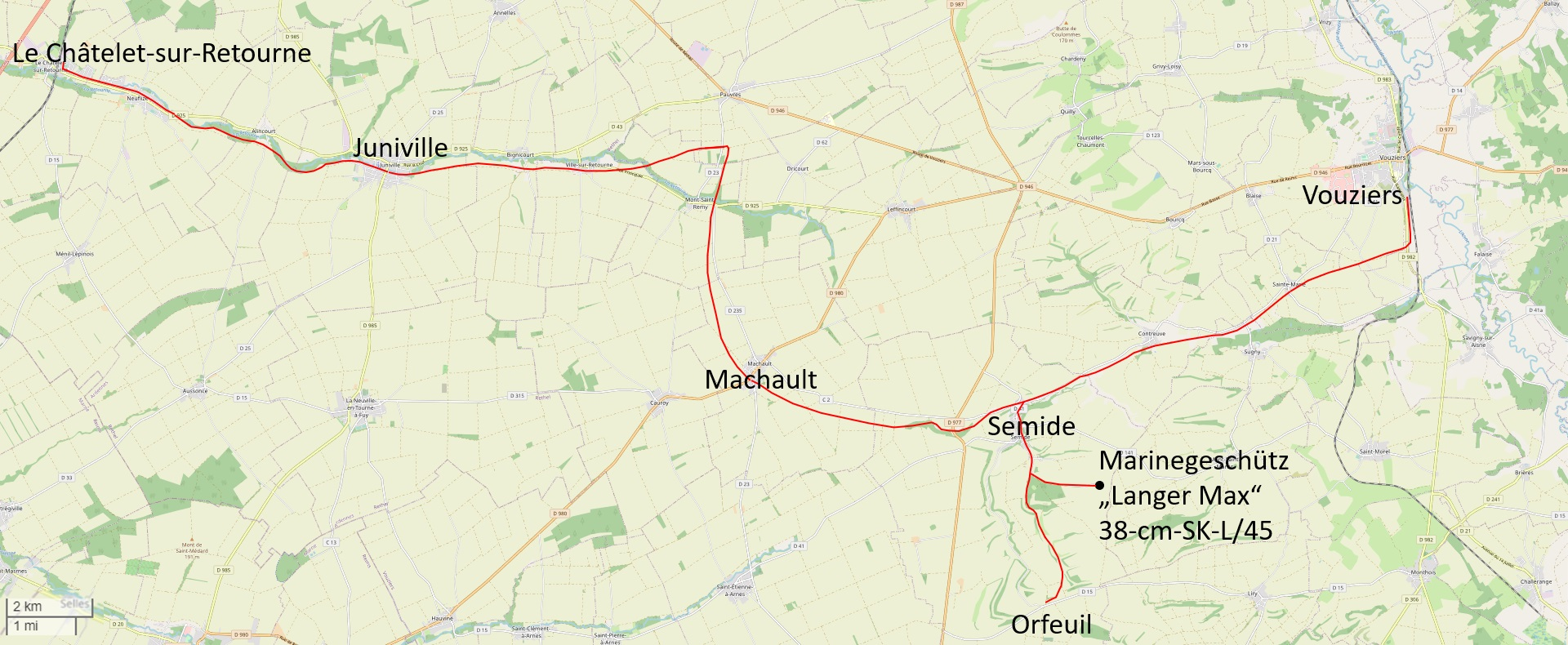
- German soldiers during the opening ceremony on 3 May 1916 in Machault Former route of the track superimposed onto a modern map

Technical
- Line length: 42 kilometres (30 mi)
- Track gauge: Tramway: 600 mm (1 ft 11 5/8 in) CA, initially: 800 mm (2 ft 7 1/2 in); CA, after 1924: 1,000 mm (3 ft 3 3/8 in) Military line: 1,435 mm (4 ft 8 1/2 in)

The Le Châtelet-sur-Retourne–Juniville–Vouziers railway line was a 42 kilometres (30 mi) long railway line in the north of France with a gauge of initially 800 mm (2 ft 7 1/2 in) and later 1,000 mm (3 ft 3 3/8 in).

== History ==
=== Narrow gauge and metre gauge railway ===
The line was built with a gauge of 800 mm (2 ft 7 1/2 in) for strategic reasons, to make it difficult for an enemy army to use in the event of an invasion. Even after the ban on the use of metre gauge had been lifted and most of the lines of the operating company had been converted to metre gauge, the unusual gauge was still maintained.

The 9 kilometres (5.6 mi) narrow gauge section from Le Châtelet-sur-Retourne to Juniville was put into service on 10 December 1900 and inaugurated on 10 February 1901 by the Chemins de fer départementaux des Ardennes (CA).

The narrow-gauge section from Juniville to Vouziers was put into service on 25 November 1906. The narrow-gauge line was converted to metre gauge in 1924. It was operated until 1933.

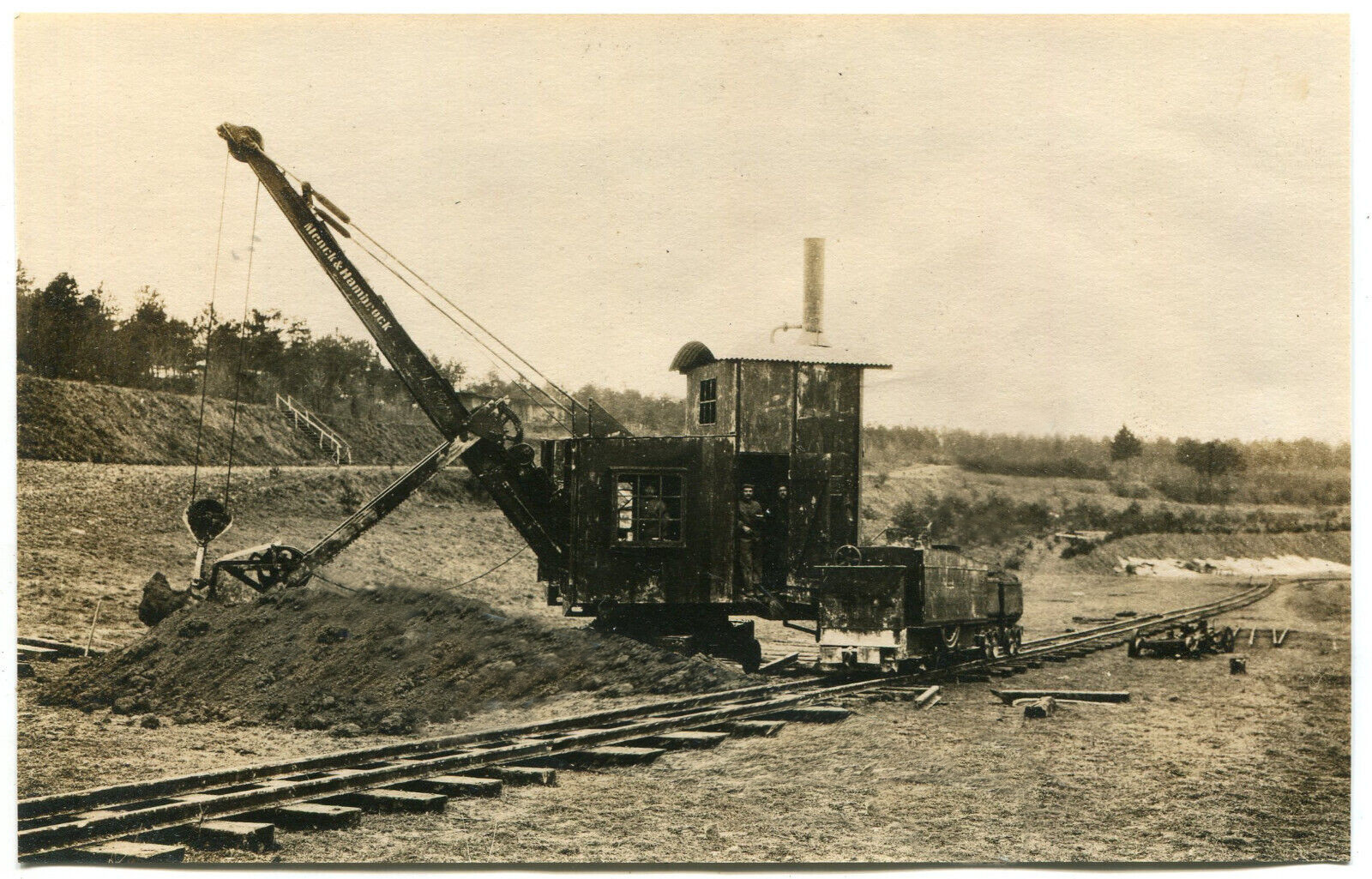
Menck & Hambrock steam shovel und Oberursel internal combustion engine locomotive near Semide

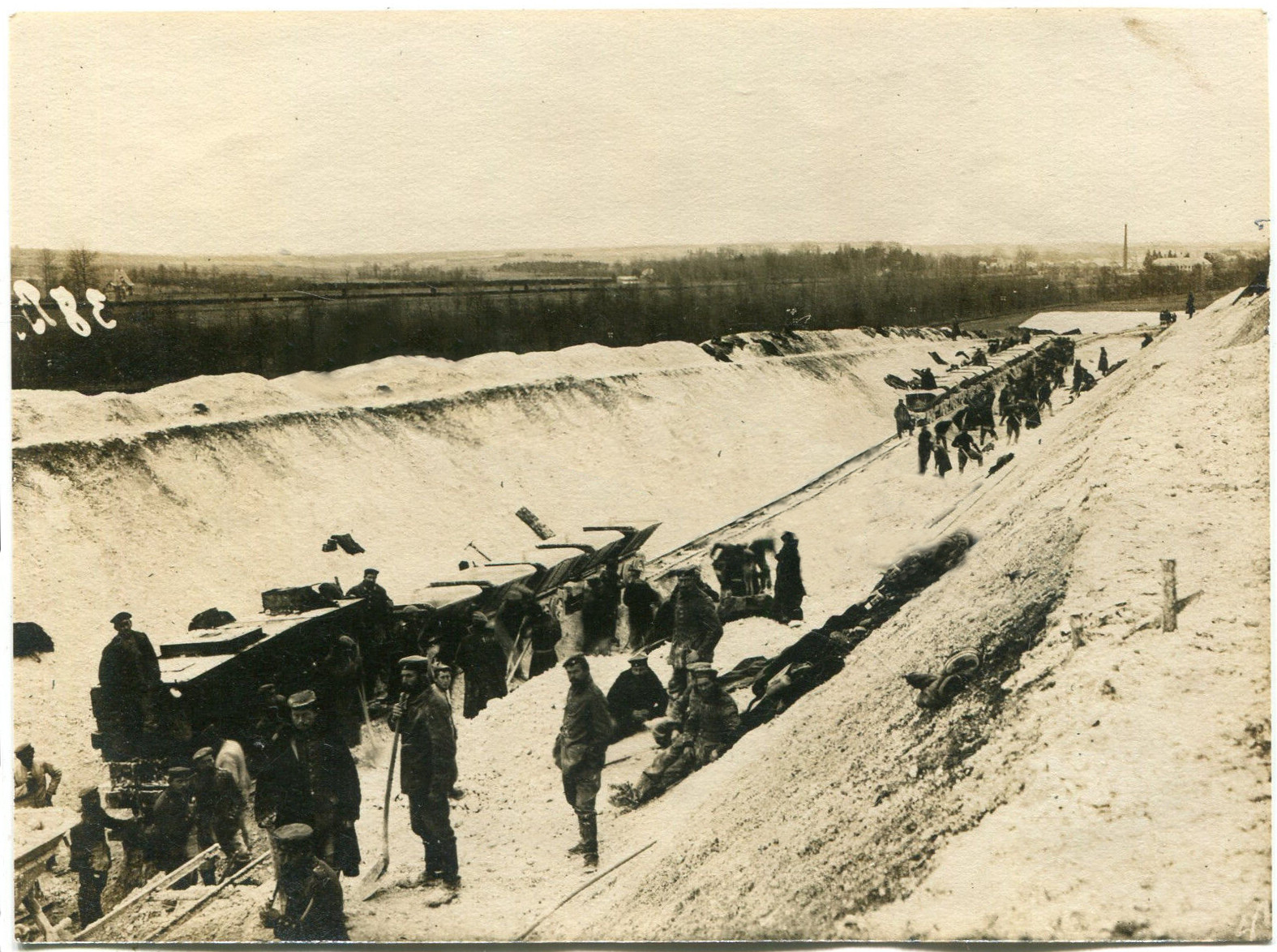
German 600-mm-gauge railway of Railway Pioneer Company 13 in the cutting near Le Châtelet

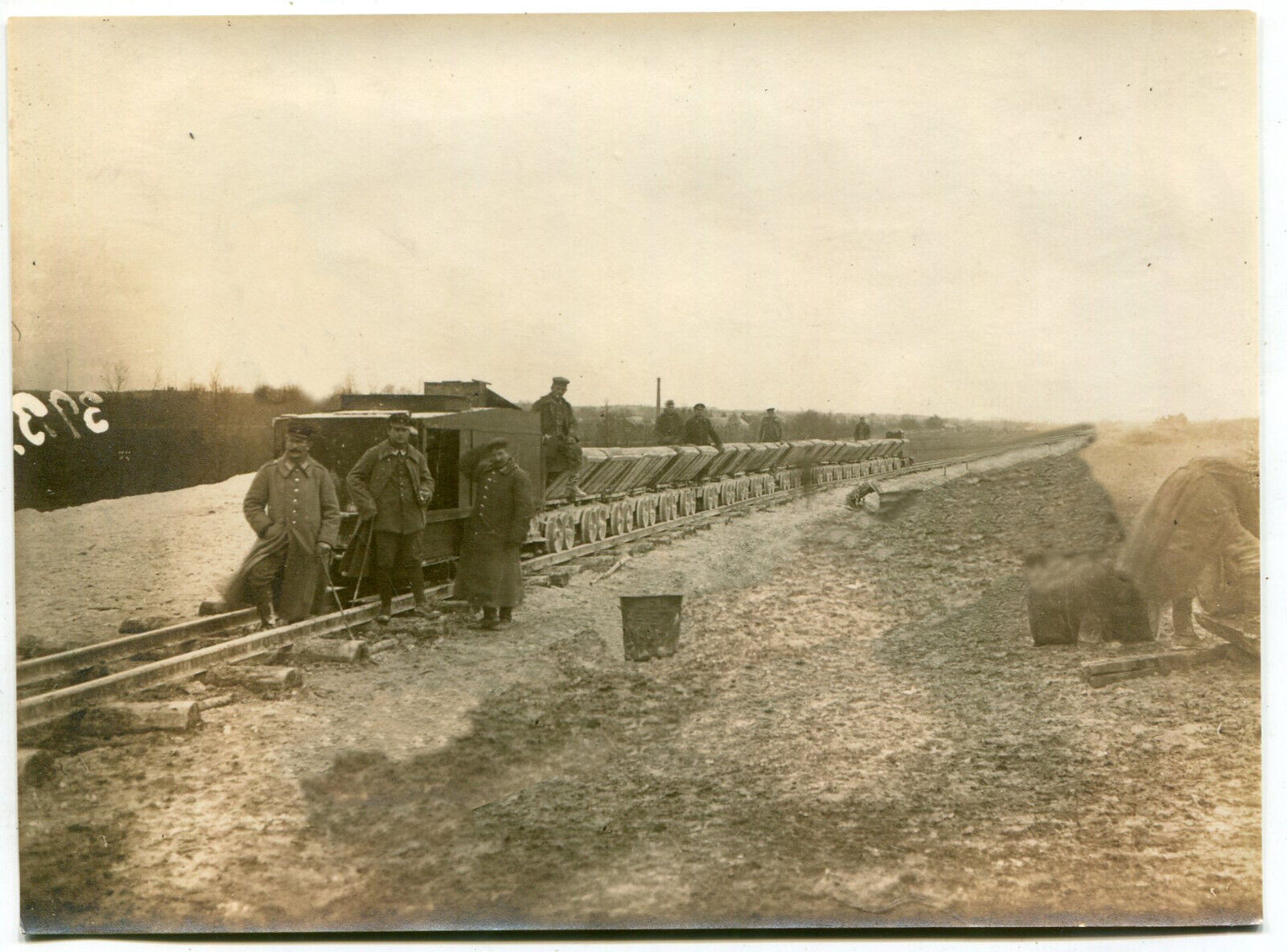
Train with a rake of V-skip trucks operated by the German Railway Pioneer Company 13 near Le Châtelet

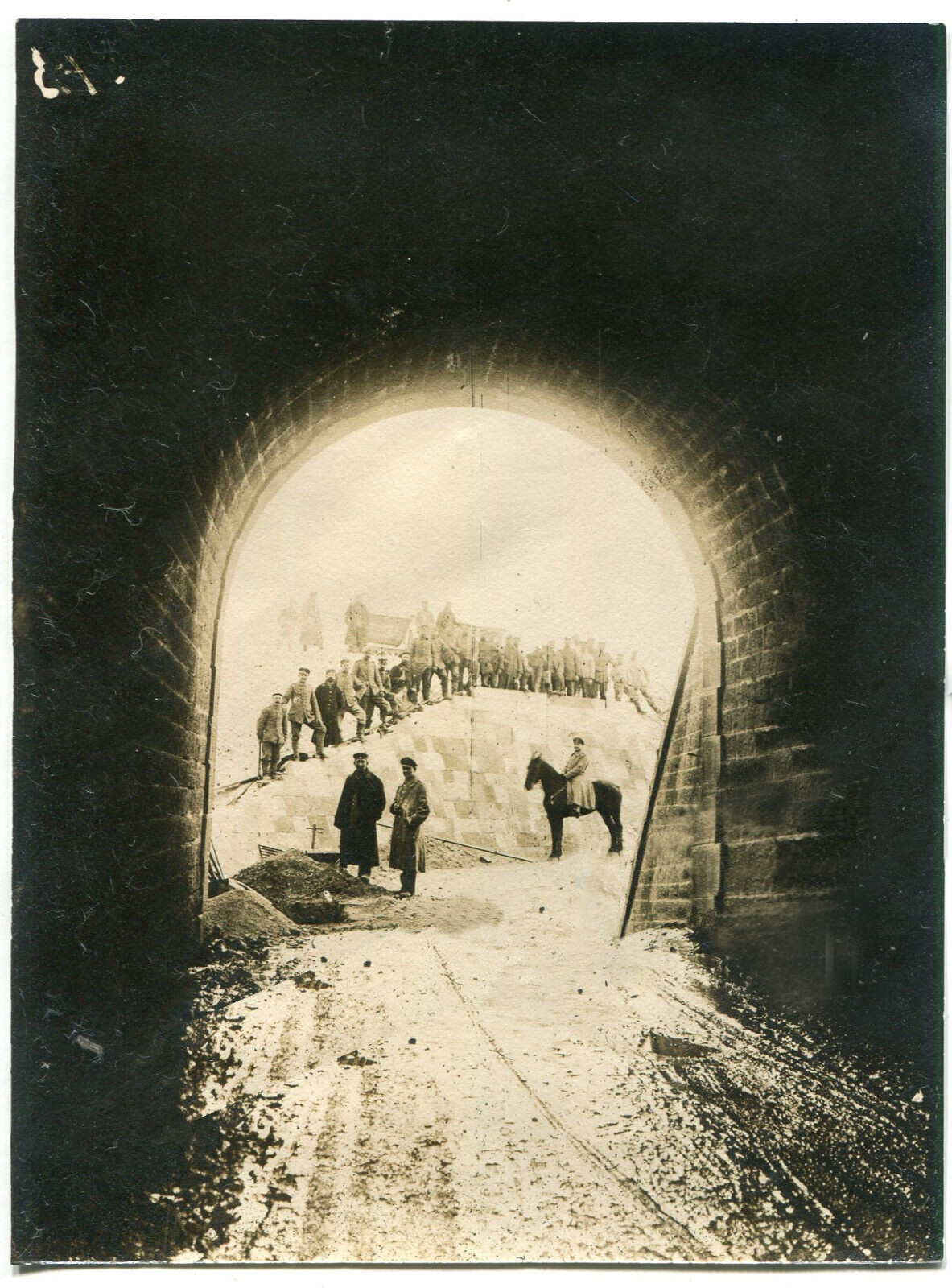
German Railway Pioneer Company 13 near Le Châtelet

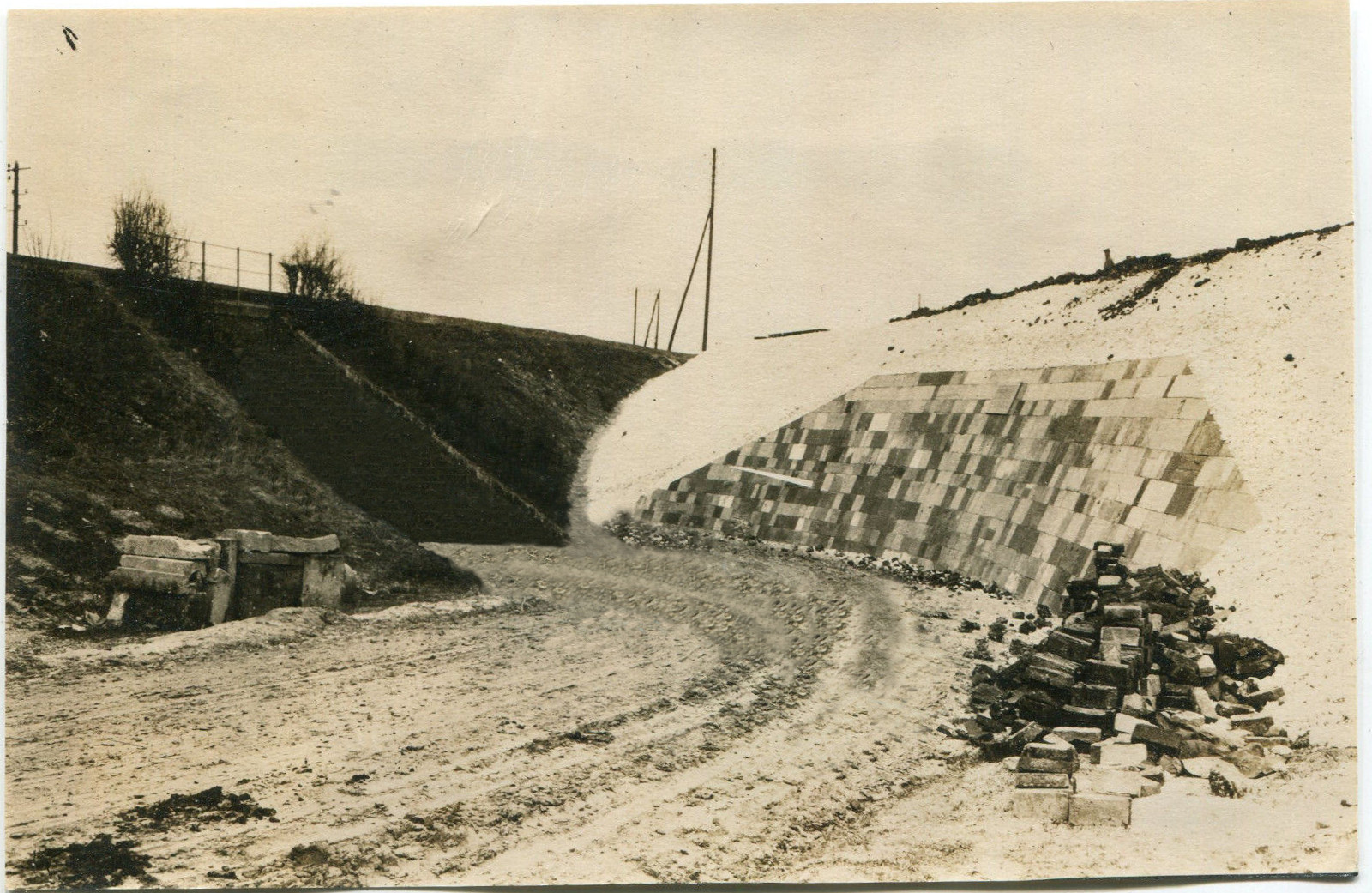
Starting point of the military railway constructed by the German Railway Pioneer Company 13 near Le Châtelet

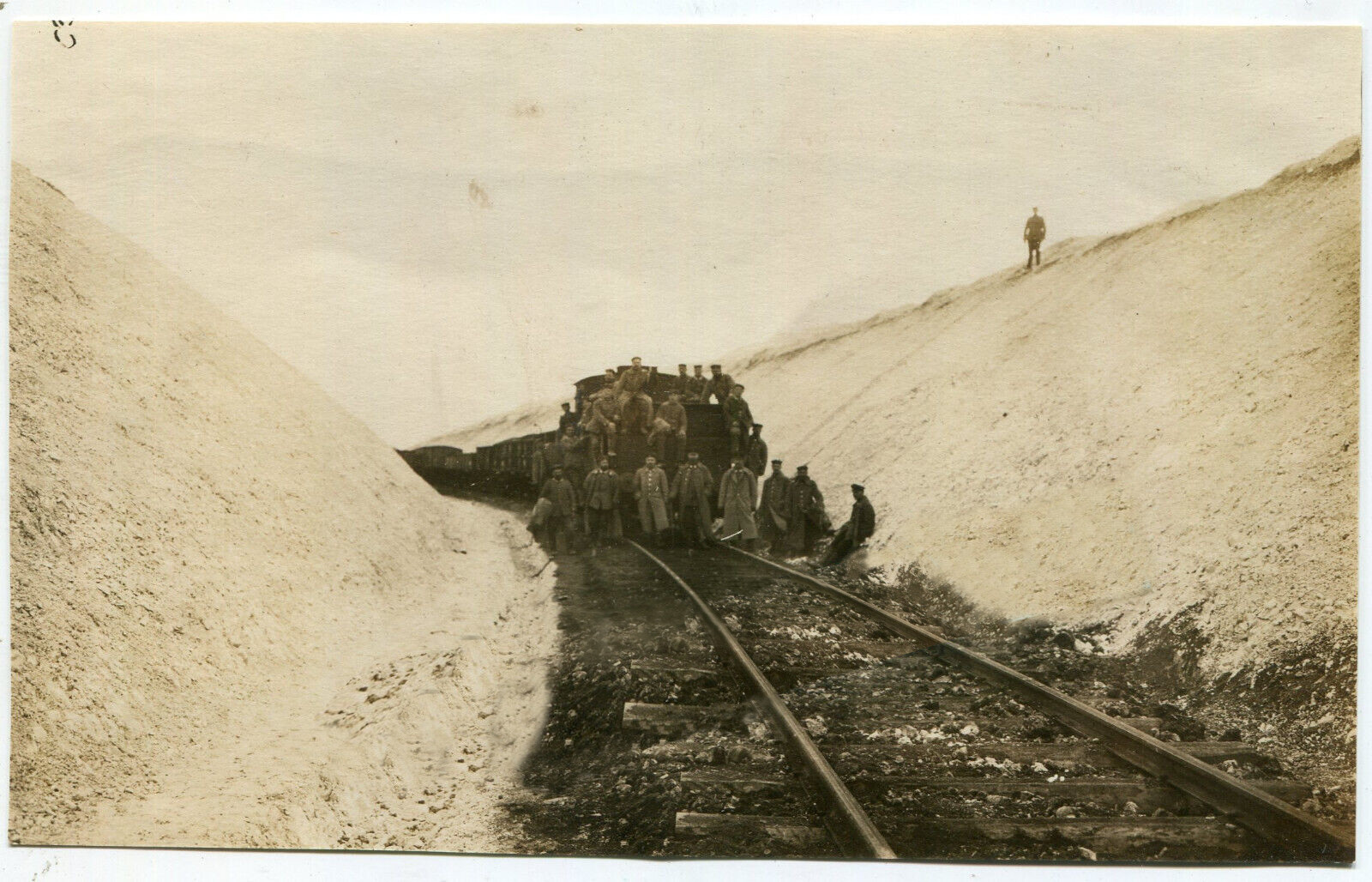
German standard gauge locomotive in the cutting near Le Châtelet

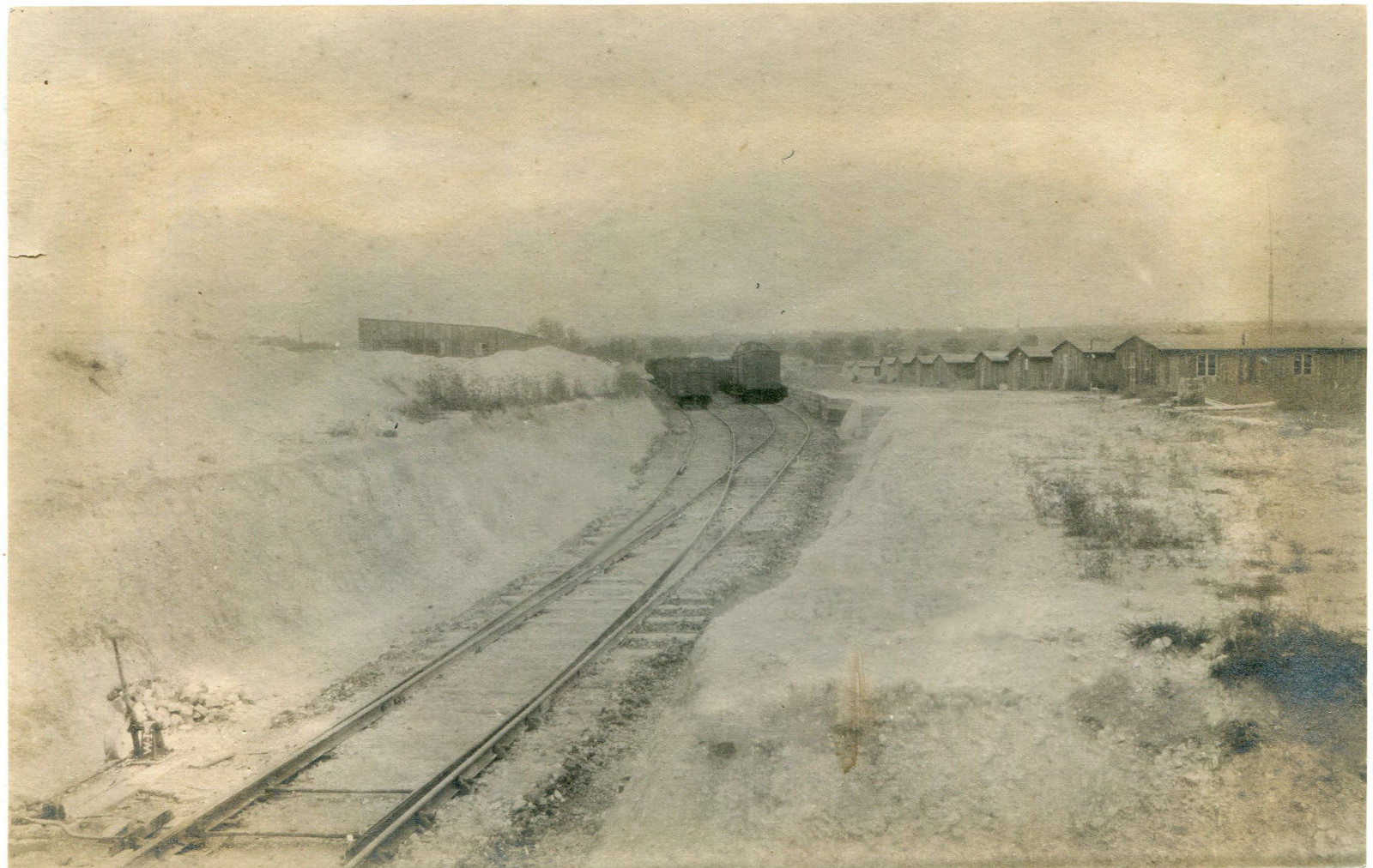
German military railway station near Semide

=== German military railway ===
During World War I, the German forces built a standard gauge military railway in the area. It was ceremonially put into operation by the German troops in Machault on 3 May 1916. Among other things, it was used to transport the German naval gun "Langer Max" (38-cm SK-L/45) to its installation site 2 kilometres (1.2 mi) southeast of Semide. The re-routing required extensive earthworks with deep and long cuts and high embankments, which German soldiers carried out with the help of an Oberursel benzene locomotive as well as with dump truck trains loaded by hand and by a Menck & Hambrock steam shovel excavator. The light railway used by the Bavarian Reserve Railway Construction Company 1 and the Railway Pioneer Company 13 during the construction work had a track gauge of 600 mm (1 ft 11 5/8 in).

=== Langer Max ===
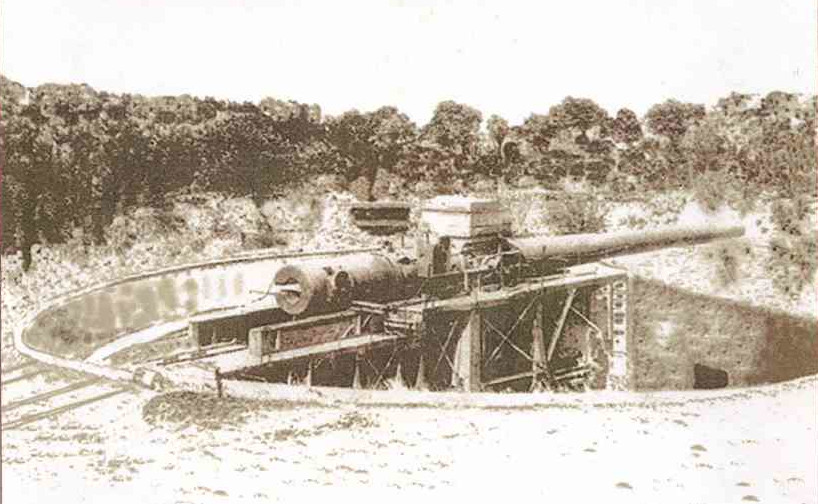
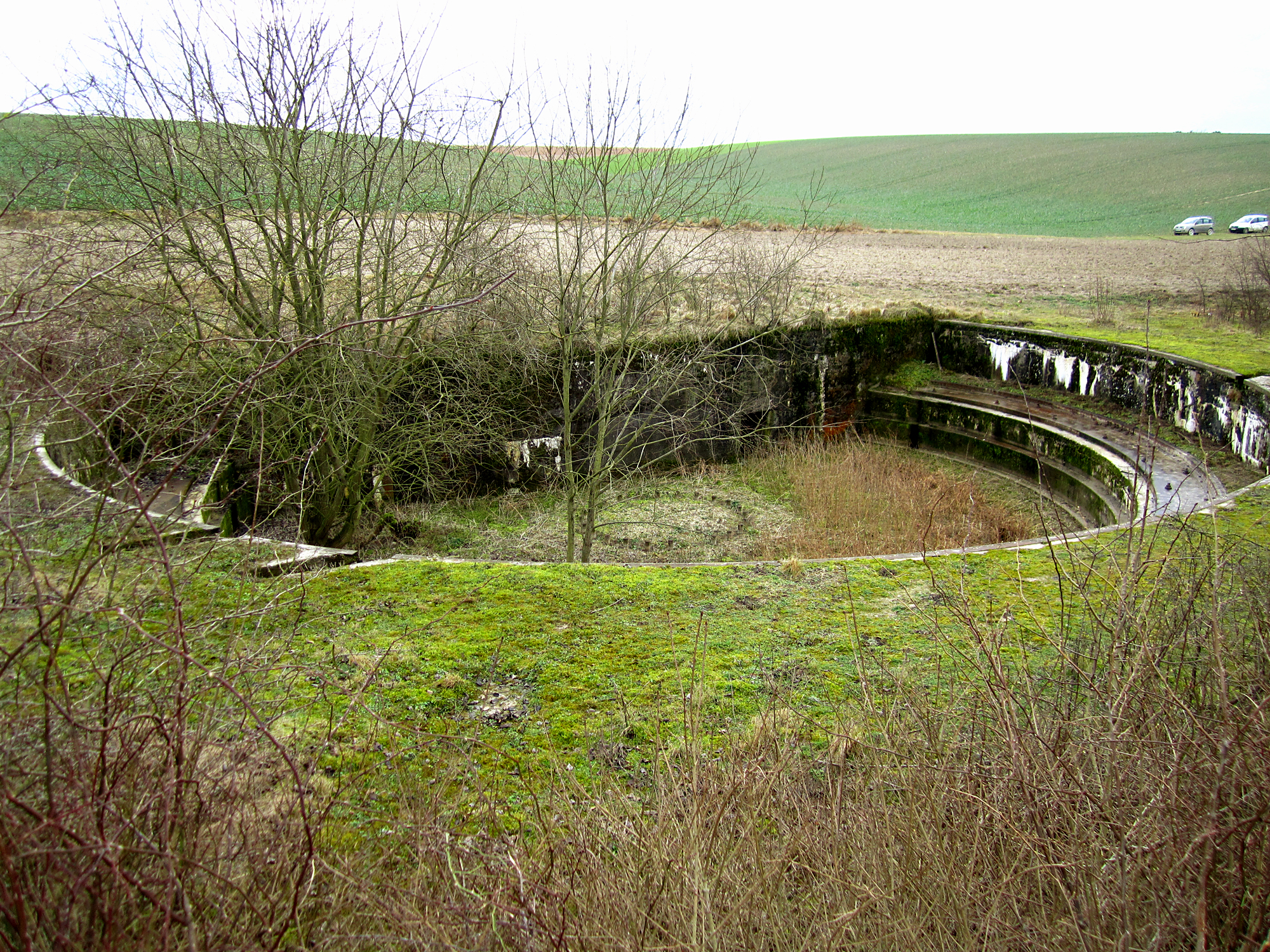
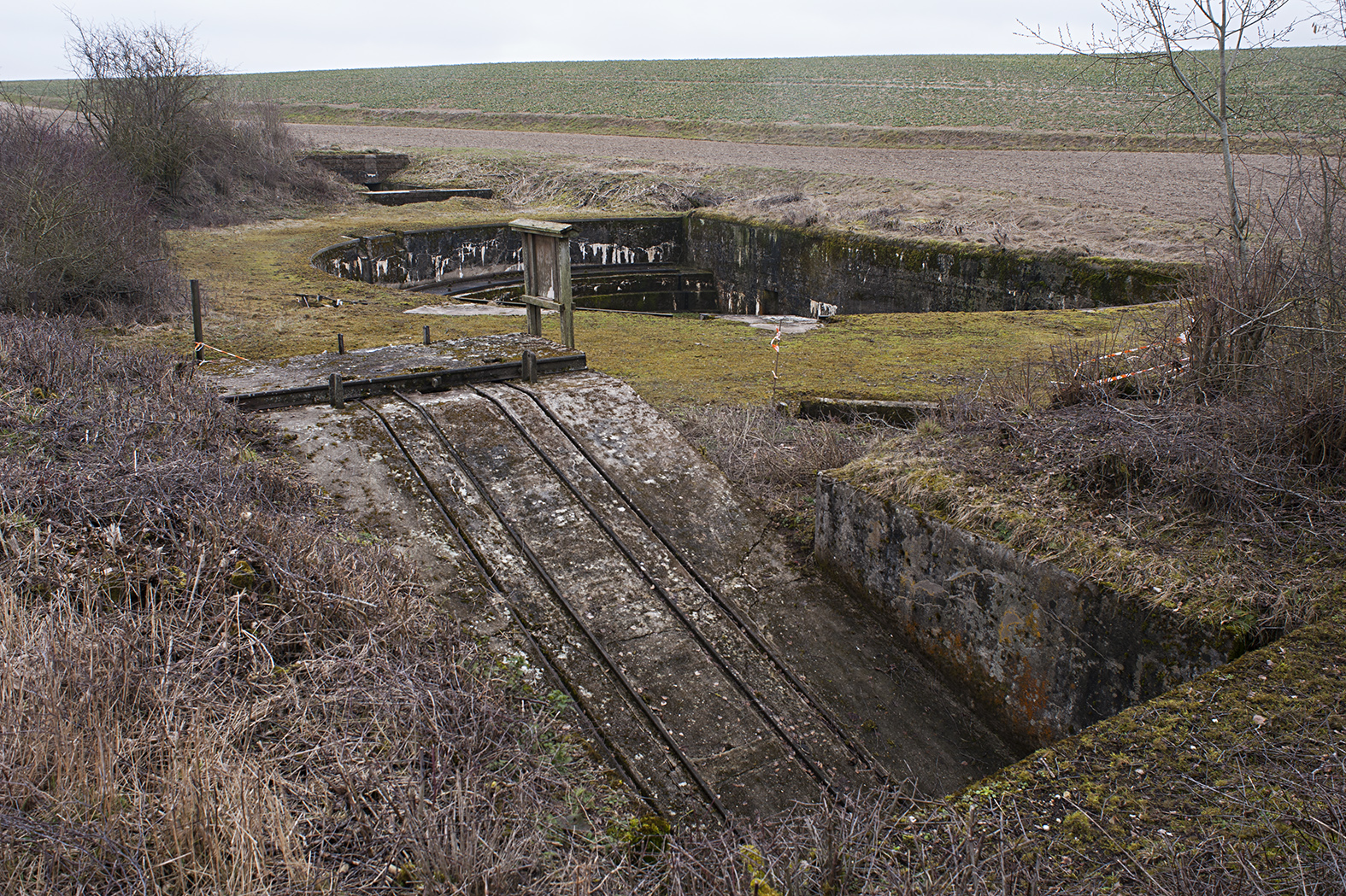
German naval gun "Langer Max" (38-cm SK-L/45) 2 kilometres (1.2 mi) southeast of Semide

The construction of a new position for the naval gun "Langer Max" began in March 1916. The Chief of Staff of the 3rd Army, Colonel Fritz von Lossberg reported to the Supreme Army Command (Oberste Heeresleitung, O.H.L.) on 19 May 1916 that the gun would be ready for action near Semide from 22 May 1916. It was to be used to fire at two railway junctions at a suitable time without revealing the top secret location of the well camouflaged gun too early. In August 1916, the 3rd Army received 25 rounds of 38-cm ammunition by order of the Supreme Army Command.

As ordered by the 3rd Army Chief of Staff, Martin Freiherr von Oldershausen on 3 November 1916, the gun fired 15 shells at the triangular junction near Saint-Hilaire-au-Temple, some 35 kilometres (20 mi) to the southwest, on 10 November 1916. According to French accounts, there was no significant damage to property and no casualties. On 11 and 15 November 1916, Sainte-Menehould was shelled with the remaining 10 shells, reportedly resulting in several wounded.

== Stations ==
Station	Photo	Comment
Le Châtelet-sur-Retourne		Temporary station building after the destruction of the original building in the First World War.
Neuflize		
Alincourt		
Juniville		
Bignicourt		
Ville-sur-Retourne		
Pauvres		
Mont-Saint-Remy		
Machault		
Semide		
Contreuve		The German station of Contreuve: In the foreground the standard gauge railway with 1435 mm gauge and in the background probably a light railway with 600 mm gauge.
Sugny		
Sainte-Marie		
Vouziers-Marizy		
Vouziers		
