= Fritz von Loßberg =

German general of the First World War

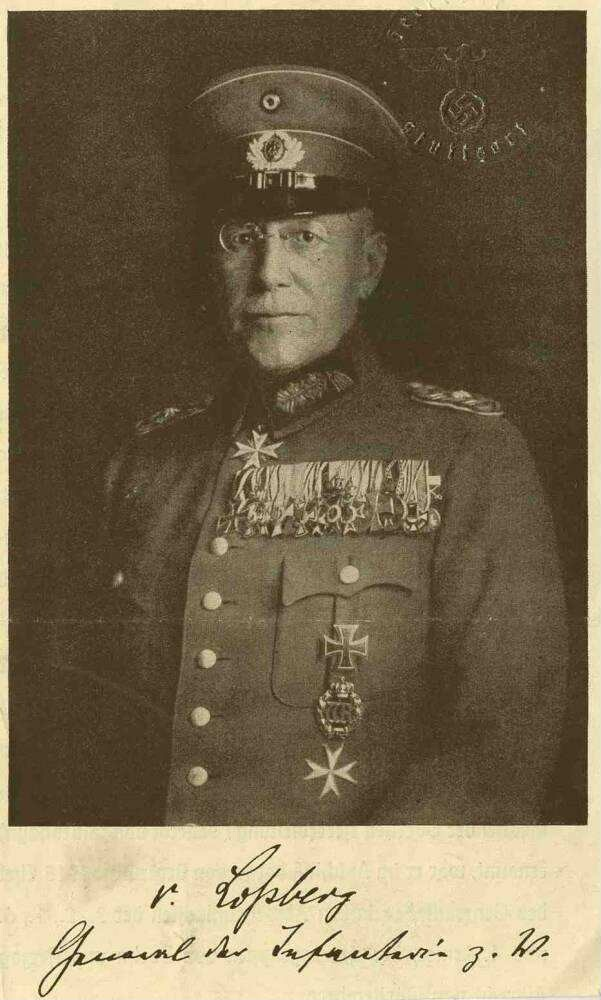
- Loßberg in Reichswehr uniform
- Born: 30 April 1868; Bad Homburg, Kingdom of Prussia
- Died: 4 May 1942 (aged 74); Lübeck, Nazi Germany
- Military career
- Allegiance: Prussia; German Empire; Weimar Republic
- Branch: Prussian Army; Reichswehr
- Service years: 1888–1926
- Rank: General der Infanterie
- Commands: Chief of staff: 3rd Army; 2nd Army; 1st Army; 6th Army; 4th Army; Army Group Boehn; Army Group Duke Albrecht
- Conflicts: World War I
- Awards: Pour le Mérite with oak leaves

Friedrich Karl "Fritz" von Loßberg (30 April 1868 – 4 May 1942) was a German colonel and later general, of the First World War. He was an operational planner, especially of defence. Loßberg served as chief of staff in the 3rd Army, 2nd Army, 6th Army and the 4th Army at the Second Battle of Champagne, Battle of the Somme, the Battle of Arras and the Third Battle of Ypres.

Loßberg was born in Bad Homburg in Hesse-Nassau. English-speaking sources often spell his name Lossberg. Loßberg was later to become "legendary as the fireman of the Western Front, always sent by the OHL to the area of crisis" (Lupfer 1981).

He was the "foremost German expert on Defensive Warfare. Was made a floating chief of staff during crises, with Vollmacht the right to issue orders in a superior's name" (Wynne 1976). In "Military Operations France and Belgium 1917 part I", Cyril Falls, the British official historian, referred to him as "a very remarkable soldier".

Loßberg was awarded the Pour le Mérite (the Blue Max) for his work on the Western Front on 9 September 1916 and oak leaves on 24 April 1917. Loßberg became one of the leading exponents of the system of defence-in-depth.

Loßberg retired from the Reichswehr on 31 January 1927 and died in Lübeck on 14 May 1942.

== Early life and the first years of World War I ==
Loßberg was born into a military family in 1868. His father, Viktor von Loßberg, was a Prussian Generalmajor. Loßberg was commissioned in the 2nd Guards Regiment as an officer in 1888; the third generation of his family to serve in it. He qualified as a general staff officer and in 1911 became an instructor at the War Academy. He was appointed chief of staff of the XIII (Royal Württemberg) Corps in 1913. In 1914 the division fought on the Western Front and Eastern Front. Promoted to lieutenant-colonel in January 1915, he was transferred to the Oberste Heeresleitung (OHL), the main army command, at Mézières in France, as deputy chief of operations. He already knew the commander, Erich von Falkenhayn, as well as the chief of operations and other members of the staff, while the Kaiser remembered him as "the fencing lieutenant in Berlin".

On the Western Front, the defenders were massed in the front line and instructed to "Hold what you are ordered to hold". Some of the OHL staff foresaw that with more guns and ammunition, the French and British preliminary bombardments would soon be converting their crowded front line into a slaughterhouse. Their thinking was stimulated by instructions captured from the French Fifth Army in May 1915 stipulating three lines of defence. The first line was manned by sentry groups, with listening posts in front. It was to be strongly built but lightly garrisoned. If attackers broke through they would face a second, main line of resistance, which included dugouts to accommodate all of the defenders of the first two lines. A third line incorporated shell-proof shelters for the reserves with the artillery just behind it. The OHL staff colonels Max Bauer and Bussche and captains Hermann Geyer and Harbou favoured defence in depth and discussed making it flexible by permitting the garrison of the front line to retreat to join the main line of resistance if the front was breached. Loßberg argued against elasticity, because he had been impressed in battle by the demoralising effect of fleeing men but by the end of 1916 Loßberg had second thoughts and began thinking of defence in depth, flexible defence and defence on reverse-slopes followed by rapid counter-attacks.

== Chief of staff ==
=== 3rd Army ===
In September 1915 the French attacked in Champagne, east of Reims along a front of 30 km (19 mi), advancing behind a cloud of poison gas and smoke. The German 3rd Army was driven out of the front line and the chief of staff proposed to withdraw 3 km (1.9 mi) further, to shelter behind a river. He was replaced by Loßberg; as he arrived at army headquarters he was telephoned by a corps commander asking whether they would still withdraw that night. Loßberg ordered him to stand fast; a few minutes later he met his commander, General Karl von Einem, who endorsed the cancellation and agreed that Loßberg might go immediately to the front with full powers. The French were sure to attack again once they had moved their artillery forward. When Loßberg arrived at the heights on the north side of the valley, he was immediately struck by the strength of the position they had been forced to occupy. They were now defending a reserve trench on a reverse slope 200 m (660 ft) beneath the crest.

The line was hidden from French observation and the defenders could shoot down attackers as they emerged over the crest. Its flaw was that the German artillery observers, usually placed in the front line, were also blind. Loßberg ordered the observers to set up their positions along the crest where he was standing, which gave them a perfect view of the slope opposite where attackers would appear and they would no longer work in the noisy, smoky confusion of the front line during an attack. The reserves were placed just behind the northern hill, where Loßberg ordered shelters to be built for them. Pickets were dotted along the crest of the hill facing the French. These depositions fit perfectly to his belief that the "Strength of the defense lies in concealment from enemy observation". Then he motored to the headquarters of each of his corps to direct them to position their lines similarly. The new defensive line contained further French attacks.

=== 2nd Army ===
When the British and French attacked at the opening of the Battle of the Somme, Falkenhayn summoned Loßberg to his bedside at 01:00 to ask him to take over as chief of staff of the 2nd Army where the French and British had penetrated. Loßberg would agree only if the German attacks at the Battle of Verdun were stopped. Falkenhayn shook hands—but never kept his promise. At the 2nd Army headquarters its commander, Fritz von Below, gave Loßberg permission to go to front with the power to issue orders (Vollmacht). When Loßberg saw how the original front line trenches had been utterly demolished by the Anglo-French bombardments, he ordered the defenders to stand where they were but to adopt a mobile defence in depth. The front line was to be held lightly, with the defenders moving forward into shell holes as soon as a bombardment began. The artillery observers were moved behind the main line of resistance to higher ground where the reserves for the battalion holding the sector were also sheltered.

Enemy penetrations would be driven back by counter-attacks. If possible, an immediate counter-attack (Gegenstoß) would be launched by the two reserve battalions of the regiment holding the sector. It would be led by the front-line battalion commander, who knew the conditions best. Close behind the front Loßberg stationed counter-attack divisions. In Loßberg's system, corps, which had contained a set trio of divisions, became responsible for the length of front held by three divisions and called a Gruppe; the divisions in the corps varied but the corps remained responsible for a portion of the front. The VI Reserve Korps (General der Infanterie, Konrad von Goßler) became Gruppe Gossler. If an attack threatened, Loßberg tried to be in the front line at daybreak to gauge morale. Most days Below and Loßberg visited a section of the front, except during attacks, when they had to be at the telephone exchange. They were careful to relieve divisions when they were exhausted.

After Paul von Hindenburg and Erich Ludendorff took over the OHL on 29 August 1916, Loßberg was delighted to watch the spirit of the army revive. The German attacks on Verdun were stopped immediately. Unlike their predecessors Helmuth von Moltke the Younger and Falkenhayn, the new team solicited and freely discussed ideas. Loßberg was asked for a report describing his defensive tactics. In September construction began on a new defensive position well behind the front, known as the Siegfriedstellung (Hindenburg line to the British). It was built with all recent refinements, including shallow dugouts with concrete roofs that could be left quickly when attacks began. When Loßberg motored through the position he saw that the artillery observation posts were built into the front line trenches on a forward slope, exposed to enemy ground observers.

Supported by Below and Crown Prince Rupprecht of Bavaria the army group commander, Loßberg argued for building a new line ahead of the existing position, on reverse slopes, with positions for a thinly manned outpost line on the crest, which meant that the artillery observers were in the old first line, now the new second line, overlooking the front position. The OHL issued a paper the "Conduct of the Defensive Battle" on 1 December 1916. Mostly written by junior staff officers, it incorporated many of Loßberg's ideas for mobile defence in depth but also recommended elasticity: permitting the defenders of the front line to retreat if forced. Loßberg still strongly opposed elasticity in his report published by the OHL on 30 January 1917.

=== 6th Army ===
The British attacked the 6th Army near Arras on 9 April 1917, advancing behind a creeping barrage for almost 4 km (2.5 mi), capturing Vimy Ridge, which gave their observers a commanding view over the Douai Plain. On 11 April, Loßberg was made chief of staff of the 6th Army. He found the defenders in chaos but in the Crown Prince Rupprecht's words he was "almost superhumanly imperturbable". He swiftly organised new defensive lines, telephoning Ludendorff that this time the defence would be elastic because the front line was so readily observed. If necessary the front line defenders would withdraw and the battle would be fought at the second line, which was mostly on a reverse slope, easily watched by German artillery observers. Counter-attacking infantry were now using stormtrooper tactics. When reserve divisions advanced from the artillery protection line to counter-attack, they came under the command of the division they were supporting. More British attacks gained no significant ground.

=== 4th Army ===
After the Battle of Messines (7–14 June 1917), Ludendorff asked Loßberg to move to Flanders as chief of staff of the 4th Army (General Friedrich Sixt von Armin). Loßberg knew the topography of the Ypres Salient from 1914. For the first time he could organise a defence in depth before an attack began. He strove to make the defenders invisible to attackers and even to their aerial observers. The defenders were provided with boards so they could shelter above the ground water that filled the bottoms of the holes and with corrugated iron and canvas for crude roofs. They were to fight to the end from these holes with their light machine-guns. The second position was about 4.5 km (2.8 mi) behind the front, near the effective limit of the British and French field guns. It had concrete nests for heavy machine guns and shelters for riflemen, mortar crews and light machine-gunners but if the attackers broke through, most of the defenders moved into shell holes so they could engage the attackers from unexpected directions. They were to hold their positions even if their line was penetrated. Before attackers reached the artillery protection line, they would be met by counter-attacks from the reserve regiment. The 14-day, 6-million-shell bombardment ended on 31 July 1917. By noon the British were penetrating the second position, when counter-attacks in the centre of the attack front pushed them back to the British second objective. It began to rain, the start of an unusually wet and cool August. The day after the attack, Loßberg was promoted to major-general.

On 16 August, the British attacked again but with orders to advance only 1,500–2,000 yd (1,400–1,800 m) before digging in to repel counter-attacks. The attack failed on the Gheluvelt Plateau and the offensive was eventually suspended for three weeks to wait for the ground to dry and to repair communications. On 20 September the British attacked again after a three-week dry spell, drove back the Germans on the Gheluvelt Plateau and destroyed German counter-attacks. Attacks on 26 September and 4 October were equally effective. Such bite and hold tactics forced the Germans to change their tactics. Ludendorff, who increasing directed the defence, placed more men in the foremost line and waited until the following day to mount a methodical counter-attack (Gegenangriff). The British artillery overwhelmed the foremost defenders and their immediate supports. On 7 October the Germans returned to a lightly held front whose garrison would retire to the main resistance line where they would be joined by counter-attack troops, while a dense artillery barrage would be laid in front of the main line of resistance. After Ludendorff took responsibility, Loßberg does not describe the further changes in his book, which was based on a diary.

Their final configuration was that each front division should establish a main line of resistance 400 m (1,300 ft) behind the front. It consisted of strong points which would hold out even if the line was breached. Heavy machine-guns, working in pairs, were just behind this position, along with a few field guns as anti-tank weapons. The battle zone extended to a depth of 8 km (5.0 mi) behind the front; it was dotted with points of resistance that if necessary would be held until relieved by a counter-attack. Since the maximum range of field artillery was 8 km (5.0 mi) attackers nearing the end of the battle zone could only be supported by their heavier guns. A reserve division was in position close behind this battle zone. If it launched a counter-attack it was under the authority the commander of the division at the front. (Note: This defensive doctrine was carried over after the end of World War I.) The British took Passchendaele Ridge on 10 November 1917. Now they faced another strong line of German field works while still another behind that was close to completion.

=== 1918 ===
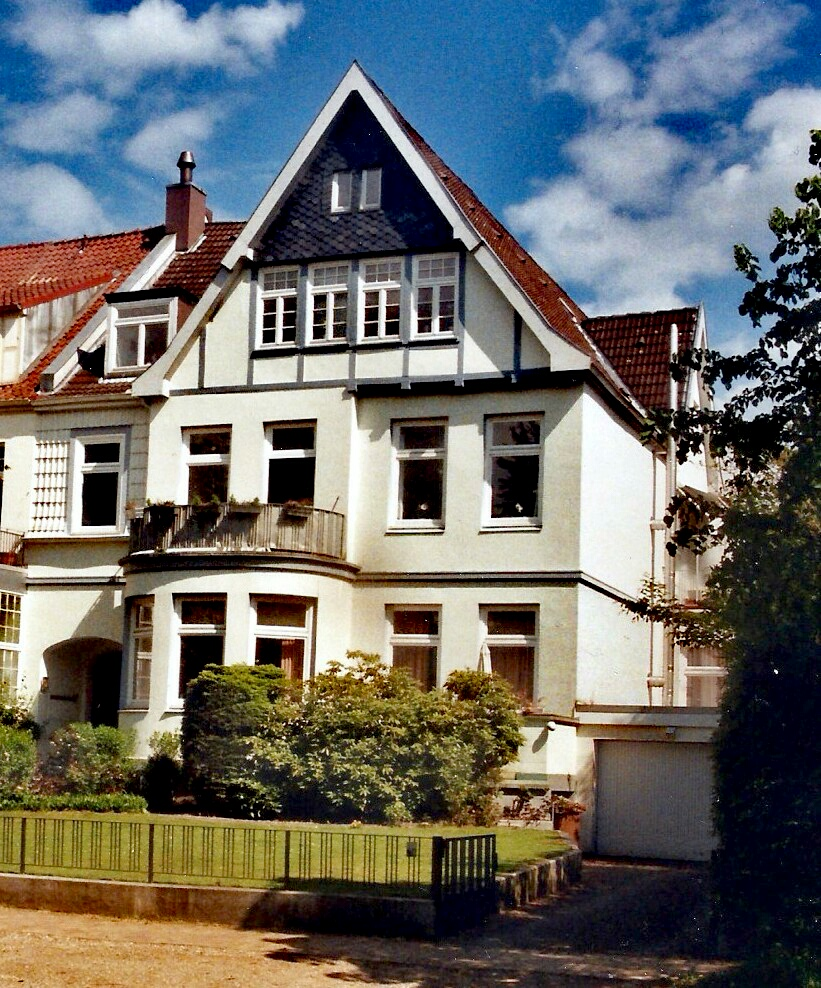
Loßberg retired to this house in Lübeck.

Loßberg wrote little in his memoirs about 1918, the year in which the Germans launched their last offensives on the Western Front, starting with Operation Michael which forced back the British near Cambrai. It created a vast salient that increased the length of the German defensive front but failed to take any strategic objective. Loßberg urged the OHL to withdraw from the useless but costly salient but they did not. The next offensive was by the 4th Army in Flanders, in which Loßberg was chief of staff, at the Battle of the Lys. There was another tactical success, which led to no strategic result. On Loßberg's advice they stopped attacking even though they had not reached the railway junction that was their objective.

The OHL shifted the attack to Champagne, to draw away the French troops who had been sent to help the British in Flanders. The German advance in the Third Battle of the Aisne was the most remarkable yet, they reached the right bank of the River Marne, only 56 km (35 mi) from Paris, which the French government prepared to evacuate. The OHL decided that they must enlarge this salient, so they would be able to bring forward enough supplies to drive on to Paris. On part of the sector assaulted the French front line was lightly held and easily overrun but as they thrust forward the attackers unexpectedly encountered the main line of resistance, beyond the range of the German field guns, where they were stopped.

The OHL decided to strike again in Flanders, to finish off the British. Ludendorff came on 18 July 1918 to discuss the next operation with the commanders there, including Rupprecht and Loßberg, who found Ludendorff "aggressive and confident". His mood was shattered by a telephone call reporting that the French and Americans had smashed through the right flank of the salient pointing toward Paris, on the opening day of the Battle of Soissons. Everyone in the room realised that they had lost the war. There were no more German attacks; the OHL was forced slowly to withdraw towards the German border, hoping to establish a shorter defensive line that could be held. First they had to evacuate all of their wounded, then essential supplies like food and ammunition and finally the fighting troops, who were being assaulted all along the front. They reorganised for withdrawal, on 8 August, Loßberg became chief of staff of Army Group von Böhn, made up of the 2nd, 18th, and 9th Armies. Early in November he was reassigned to the OHL. The Armistice of 11 November 1918 specified that all German troops still remaining in France, Belgium, Luxembourg or Alsace-Lorraine after 14 days would become prisoners of war. They were all out in time, a final display of the organisational skill of the German staffs.

== Post war ==
In the small post-war German Army, the Reichsheer, Loßberg was first in charge of defending the new eastern border with Poland. Then he became general chief of staff and later commanded the 6th Division. He retired in 1927 as a general of infantry and died in Lübeck on 14 May 1942. His son Bernhard was also a general staff officer, known for the Lossberg study for the invasion of Russia.

== Decorations and awards ==
Data taken from "Lossberg's War...." (2017) unless indicated. Loßberg was an honorary citizen of Bad Homburg, his town and received medals and decorations.

- Iron Cross of 1914, 1st and 2nd class
- Pour le Mérite (21 September 1916) with oak leaves (24 April 1917)
- Order of the Red Eagle, 4th class
- Order of the Crown, 3rd class (Prussia)
- Knight's Cross of the Royal House Order of Hohenzollern with Swords
- Service Award (Prussia)
- Honor Cross 2nd Class of the Princely House Order of Hohenzollern with Swords
- Knight's Cross of the Military Order of Max Joseph (Bavaria)
- Military Merit Order, 3rd class with Swords and Crown (Bavaria)
- Commander's Cross Second Class of the Military Order of St. Henry (Saxony)
- Knight's Cross Second Class of the Albert Order with Swords (Saxony)
- Commander of the Military Merit Order (Württemberg)
- Knight's Cross of the Order of the Crown (Württemberg)
- Commander Second Class of the Order of the Zähringer Lion (Baden)
- Bravery Medal (Hesse)
- Military Merit Cross, 2nd class (Mecklenburg-Schwerin)
- Knight's Cross, First Class of the Order of Henry the Lion
- Knight's Cross, First Class of the House and Merit Order of Peter Frederick Louis (Oldenburg)
- Commander of the Order of the White Falcon
- Hanseatic Cross of Bremen
- Commander, First Class of the Ducal Saxe-Ernestine House Order with Swords
- Cross for Merit in War (Saxe-Meiningen)

== Bibliography ==
Books

- Bavaria, Rupprecht. M. L. F. von (1929). Mein Kriegstagebuch [My War Diary]. Vol. III. München: Deutscher National Verlag AG. OCLC 643331329.
- Falls, C. (1992) [1940]. Military Operations France and Belgium 1917: The German Retreat to the Hindenburg Line and the Battles of Arras. History of the Great War Based on Official Documents by Direction of the Historical Section of the Committee of Imperial Defence. Vol. I (Imperial War Museum and Battery Press ed.). London: HMSO. ISBN 978-0-89839-180-0.
- Lossberg, Fritz von (1939). Meine Tätigkeit im Weltkriege, 1914–1918 [My Activity in the World War] (in German). Berlin: Mittler. OCLC 174418084.
- Lossberg, Fritz von (2017). Lossberg's War: The World War I Memoirs of a German Chief of Staff. Foreign Military Studies. Translated by Zabecki, D. T.; Biedekarken, D. J. Lexington, KY: University Press of Kentucky. ISBN 978-0-8131-6980-4. Translation of Meine Tätigkeit im Weltkriege 1914–1918 (Berlin, Ernst Siegfried Mittler und Sohn 1939)
  - Zabecki, D.; Biedekarken, D. J. "Translator's Introduction". In Lossberg (2017).
- Lupfer, T. (1981). The Dynamics of Doctrine: The Change in German Tactical Doctrine During the First World War (PDF). Fort Leavenworth: US Army Command and General Staff College. OCLC 8189258. Archived (PDF) from the original on 4 March 2017.
- Tucker, Spencer; Roberts, Priscilla Mary (2006). World War I: A Student Encyclopedia. ABC-CLIO. ISBN 978-1-85109-879-8.
- Wynne, G. C. (1976) [1939]. If Germany Attacks: The Battle in Depth in the West (Greenwood Press, NY ed.). London: Faber & Faber. ISBN 978-0-8371-5029-1.

Encyclopedias

- Fisher, Stephen D. (1996). "Lossberg, Fredrick von [1868–1942]". In Tucker, Spencer C. (ed.). The European Powers in the First World War: An Encyclopedia. Garland Reference Library of the Humanities. Vol. 1483. New York: Garland: Garland. ISBN 978-0-8153-0399-2.

Magazines

- "Defense in Depth". Time. New York. 25 September 1939. ISSN 0040-781X. Archived from the original on 8 March 2008.

Theses

- Meyer, Bradley J. (1981). "The Defense Expert: Fritz von Lossberg" (PDF). Innovation and Expertise: Some Changes in German Tactical Doctrine during World War I (MA [unpublished]). Columbus, OH: Department of History, Ohio State University. pp. 30–80. OCLC 9565612 – via Ohio State University.
