= 6th Division (Reichswehr) =

- 6. Division
- Active: 1921–1934
- Disbanded: October 1934
- Country: Weimar Republic
- Branch: Reichsheer
- Type: Infantry
- Size: Division
- Part of: Gruppenkommando 2
- Garrison/HQ: Wehrkreis VI: Münster

Commanders
- Notable commanders: Fritz von Loßberg

The 6th Division was a unit of the Reichswehr.

== Creation ==
In the Order of 31 July 1920 for the Reduction of the Army (to comply with the upper limits on the size of the military contained in the Treaty of Versailles), it was determined that in every Wehrkreis (military district) a division would be established by 1 October 1920. The 6th Division was formed in January 1921 out of the Reichswehr's 7th and 10th Brigades, both part of the former Übergangsheer (Transition Army).

It consisted of 3 infantry regiments, the 16th, 17th and 18th Infantry Regiments. It also included the 6th (Prussian) Artillery Regiment, an engineering battalion, a signals battalion, a transportation battalion, and a medical battalion. It was subordinated to Gruppenkommando 2.

The commander of Wehrkreis VI was simultaneously the commander of the 6th Division. For the leadership of the troops, an Infanterieführer and an Artillerieführer were appointed, both subordinated to the commander of the division.

The unit ceased to exist as such after October 1934, and its subordinate units were transferred to the 21 new divisions created in that year.

== Divisional commanders ==
- General der Infanterie Friedrich von Lossberg (1 October 1920 - 1 January 1925)
- General der Infanterie Leopold Freiherr von Ledebur (1 January 1925 - 28 February 1928)
- General der Artillerie Max Föhrenbach (1 March 1928 - 1 May 1931)
- Generalleutnant Wolfgang Fleck (1 May 1931 - 30 September 1934)

=== Infantrieführers ===
- Generalleutnant Otto Haas (1 October 1920 - 2 August 1921)
- Generalleutnant Erwin Voigt (3 August 1921 - 30 September 1923)
- Generalmajor Ernst Freiherr von Forstner (1 October 1923 - 31 March 1927)
- Generalmajor Lothar Fritsch (1 April 1927 - 31 January 1929)
- Generalleutnant Max von Schenckendorff (1 February 1929 - 31 January 1930)
- Generalmajor Hans Schmidt (1 February 1930 - 31 January 1931)
- Generalleutnant Franz von Roques (1 February 1931 - 30 September 1933)
- Oberst Erwin von Witzleben (1 October 1933 - 31 January 1934)
- Generalmajor Konrad von Gossler (1 February 1934 - 30 September 1934)
- Generalmajor Wilhelm Keitel (1 October 1934 - 30 September 1935)
- Generalleutnant Adolf Strauss (1 October 1935 - 15 October 1935).

== Garrison ==
The divisional headquarters was in Münster.
