= Military Merit Cross (Mecklenburg-Schwerin) =

Military award

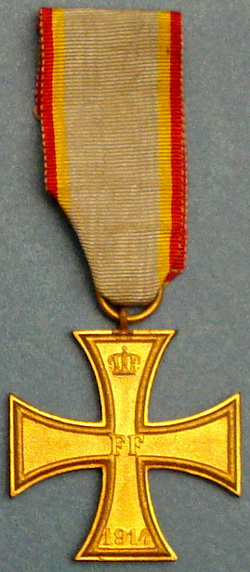
- 1914 Military Merit Cross 2nd Class
- Type: Cross in two classes
- Awarded for: Bravery or military merit in wartime
- Description: Bronze gilt cross pattée; 1st Class is a pinback decoration, 2nd Class is worn from a ribbon
- Presented by: Grand Duchy of Mecklenburg-Schwerin
- Eligibility: Military decoration for all ranks
- Campaign: Several campaigns (see text)
- Status: Obsolete
- Established: August 5, 1848
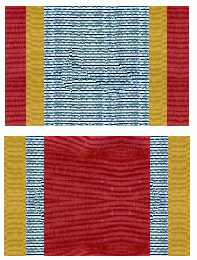
- Combatant ribbon (top), non-combatant ribbon (bottom)

Precedence
- Next (higher): 1st Class ranks above 2nd Class
- Related: Prussian Iron Cross, 1st and 2nd Class

The Military Merit Cross (Militärverdienstkreuz) was established by Friedrich Franz II, Grand Duke of Mecklenburg-Schwerin on August 5, 1848. Mecklenburg-Schwerin, a grand duchy located in northern Germany, was a member of the German Confederation and later the German Empire.

In several respects, Mecklenburg-Schwerin's Military Merit Cross was patterned after the Prussian Iron Cross. Both came in two classes, a pinback 1st Class and a 2nd Class worn from a ribbon, both were awarded without regard to rank (most other orders and medals of both states were awarded in different classes based on the rank or status of the recipient), and both were awarded for specific campaigns, as indicated by a date on the bottom arm of the cross. However, there were more versions of the Mecklenburg cross than of the Prussian cross (which was only awarded by Prussia in the Napoleonic Wars, the Franco-Prussian War and World War I, and by Nazi Germany in World War II).

== Criteria ==
The first versions were dated 1848 and 1849, and awarded for merit in the First War of Schleswig and in the suppression of the German Revolution of 1848-49 (some Mecklenburg troops were sent to Baden in 1849 while others remained in the fighting in Schleswig). In 1859, some Mecklenburg observers and Austrian officers were decorated for merit during the Second Italian War of Independence. The next version was dated 1864, and recognized merit in the Second War of Schleswig, also called the German-Danish War. Mecklenburg-Schwerin's participation on the side of Prussia and other north German states in the Austro-Prussian War led to the next version, dated 1866.

An 1870 version was created for the Franco-Prussian War, where Mecklenburg troops fought as part of the 17th Division. In this war, a number of officers and soldiers received both the Iron Cross and the Mecklenburg-Schwerin Military Merit Cross.

The next version was dated 1877. This was not awarded to Mecklenburgers (except for a few military observers), but to Russians and Romanians in the Russo-Turkish War (1877–1878). Certain German states, especially Mecklenburg-Schwerin, were sympathetic to the Russian and Romanian cause, and had dynastic connections to both states. Grand Duke Friedrich Franz II's grandmother was Grand Duchess Elena Pavlovna of Russia, his daughter was married to Tsar Alexander II of Russia's son, and his son and heir, Friedrich Franz III, would marry Grand Duchess Anastasia Mikhailovna of Russia in 1879. The Romanian royal family was a branch of the Hohenzollerns, the ruling house of Prussia and the newly created German Empire.

A version dated 1900 was struck for Mecklenburgers who had distinguished themselves in the Boxer Rebellion of 1900-01. An undated version was then created, which was awarded for merit in various colonial conflicts of the first decade of the 20th century, including the Herero Wars (a series of brutal conflicts where some Germans displayed great bravery in fighting guerrillas from the Herero and other tribes, while other Germans perpetrated what has come to be seen as the genocide of the Herero people).

Germany entered World War I in the first days of August 1914. On February 28, 1915, Friedrich Franz IV, Grand Duke of Mecklenburg-Schwerin, reauthorized the Military Merit Cross. The new version was dated 1914 and awards were made retroactively to the beginning of the war. Both classes of the Military Merit Cross continued to be awarded throughout the war, both to Mecklenburgers and to soldiers of other German states and German allies. Upon Friedrich Franz IV's abdication on November 14, 1918, the Military Merit Cross became obsolete. It continued to be permitted for wear by those who had received it through the Weimar era, the Third Reich and in West Germany (it is unclear whether East Germany permitted the wear of any Imperial German decorations).

== Description ==
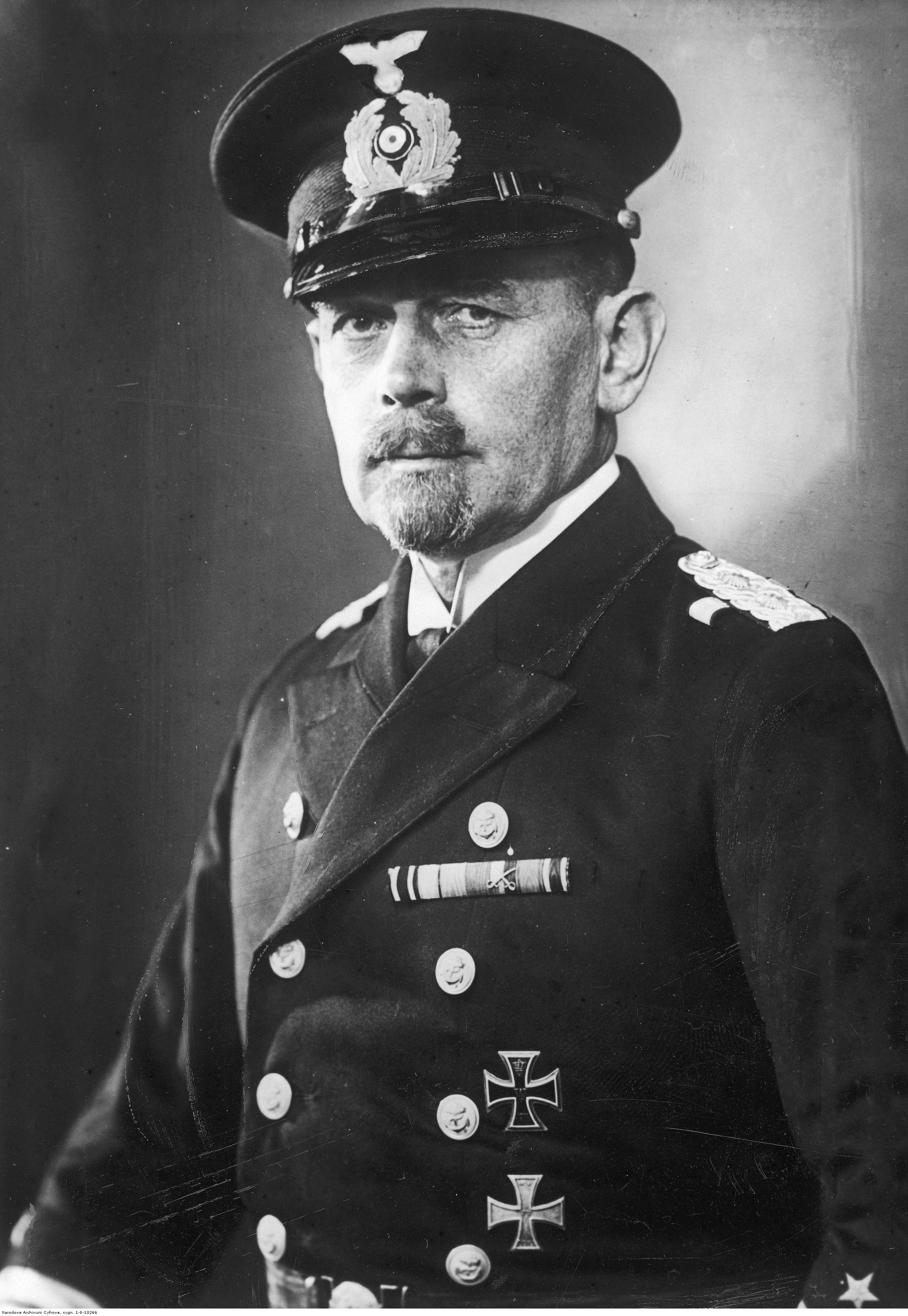
Admiral Rolf Carls wearing the 1st Class cross below the Iron Cross 1st Class.

In all its versions, the Mecklenburg-Schwerin Military Merit Cross was a bronze gilt cross pattée in design, similar to the Iron Cross but with slightly narrower arms. The obverse bore a crown on the upper arm, the initials of Friedrich Franz in the center, and the date (except for the colonial version) at the bottom of the lower arm. The reverse of the 2nd Class bore the legend "Für Auszeichnung im Kriege" ("For distinction in the war"). The reverse of the 1st Class, a pinback cross (Steckkreuz), was blank.

The ribbon was light blue with narrow edge stripes of yellow and red (with the red stripes on the outside). For awards to non-combatants, the same cross was worn, but the ribbon was changed to red with light blue and yellow edge stripes.

== Notable recipients ==
Alphabetical by highest class. Members of noble houses are alphabetized by the name of the house. The dates are the dates of the crosses, as discussed above, not necessarily the date of the actual award.

=== First class ===
- Joachim von Amsberg
- Archduke Friedrich of Austria, Duke of Teschen (1914)
- Gustav Bachmann (1914)
- Frederick I, Grand Duke of Baden
- Frederick II, Grand Duke of Baden (1914)
- Rupprecht, Crown Prince of Bavaria (1914)
- Prince Leopold of Bavaria
- Leonhard Graf von Blumenthal
- Max von Boehn (1914, 2nd Class in 1870)
- Kuno-Hans von Both (1914)
- Rolf Carls
- Otto Elfeldt (1914)
- Karl von Graffen
- Kurt Grasshoff
- Gottlieb Graf von Haeseler
- Adolf Hamann
- Kurt Freiherr von Hammerstein-Equord
- Paul von Hindenburg (1914)
- Franz Ritter von Hipper (1914)
- Prince Kraft of Hohenlohe-Ingelfingen
- Leo von Jena
- Hugo Graf von Kirchbach
- Waldemar Kophamel
- Wilhelm Friedrich Loeper (1914)
- Felix Graf von Luckner
- Vollrath Lübbe
- Kurt-Jürgen Freiherr von Lützow
- August von Mackensen (1914)
- Edwin Freiherr von Manteuffel
- Frederick Francis II, Grand Duke of Mecklenburg-Schwerin (1848)
- Frederick Francis IV, Grand Duke of Mecklenburg-Schwerin (1914)
- Adolphus Frederick VI, Grand Duke of Mecklenburg-Strelitz (1914)
- Johann Albrecht, Duke of Mecklenburg (1914)
- Paul Friedrich, Duke of Mecklenburg
- Duke William of Mecklenburg-Schwerin
- Helmuth Graf von Moltke the Elder
- Wolfgang Muff (1914)
- Artur Nepokoychitsky (1877)
- Karl August Nerger (1914)
- Hugo Freiherr von Obernitz
- Alexander August Wilhelm von Pape
- Friedrich Paulus
- Gunther Plüschow
- Wilhelm I, German Emperor and King of Prussia
- Friedrich III, German Emperor and King of Prussia
- Wilhelm II, German Emperor and King of Prussia (1914)
- Wilhelm, German Crown Prince and Crown Prince of Prussia (1914)
- Prince Adalbert of Prussia
- Prince Albert of Prussia
- Prince Friedrich Leopold of Prussia
- Prince Joachim of Prussia
- Wilhelm Malte II, Prince and Lord of Putbus
- Heinz von Randow (1914)
- Heino von Rantzau
- Gustav Waldemar von Rauch
- Edwin Graf von Rothkirch und Trach (1914)
- Grand Duke Konstantin Konstantinovich of Russia (1877)
- Grand Duke Michael Nikolaevich of Russia (1877)
- Grand Duke Nicholas Nikolaevich of Russia (1877)
- Grand Duke Sergei Alexandrovich of Russia (1877)
- Reinhard Scheer (1914)
- Alfred Graf von Schlieffen (1870)
- August Schmidt
- Friedrich Graf von der Schulenburg
- Hans von Seeckt
- Karl Friedrich von Steinmetz
- Johann Baptist Stephan (1870)
- Ludwig Freiherr von und zu der Tann-Rathsamhausen
- Adolf von Trotha
- Konstantin Bernhard von Voigts-Rhetz
- Alfred Graf von Waldersee
- August Graf von Werder
- Georg Wetzell (1914)
- Friedrich Graf von Wrangel
- Gustav Adolf von Wulffen
- Albrecht, Duke of Württemberg (1914)
- Wilhelm, Duke of Württemberg

=== Second class ===
- Max Bastian (1914)
- Alexander of Battenberg (1877)
- Prince Arnulf of Bavaria (1870)
- Duke Maximilian Emanuel in Bavaria (1870)
- Hans Behlendorff (1914)
- Fedor von Bock (1914)
- Karl Bolle (1914)
- Kuno-Hans von Both (1914)
- Franz Breithaupt (1914)
- Paul Bronsart von Schellendorff (1870)
- Walther Bronsart von Schellendorff (1870)
- Walter von Bülow-Bothkamp (1914)
- Carl Clewing (1914)
- Berthold von Deimling (1914)
- Theodor Duesterberg (1914)
- Franz Ritter von Epp (1914)
- Waldemar Erfurth (1914)
- Günther von Etzel (1914)
- Nikolaus von Falkenhorst (1914)
- August Karl von Goeben (1864)
- Wilhelm Groener (1914)
- Karl Eberhard Herwarth von Bittenfeld (1864)
- Prince Alexander of Hesse and by Rhine (1859)
- Prince Heinrich of Hesse and by Rhine (1870)
- Ernst II, Prince of Hohenlohe-Langenburg (1914)
- Frederick, Prince of Hohenzollern (1914)
- Franz Ritter von Hörauf (1914)
- Günther von Kluge (1914)
- Wilhelm Ritter von Leeb (1914)
- Fritz von Loßberg (1914)
- Erich Ludendorff (1914)
- Albrecht Gustav von Manstein (1864)
- Frederick Francis III, Grand Duke of Mecklenburg-Schwerin (1870)
- Adolphus Frederick V, Grand Duke of Mecklenburg-Strelitz (1870)
- Walter Model (1914)
- Hans Pfundtner (1914)
- Carol I of Romania (1877)
- Albrecht Graf von Roon (1870)
- Ernst I, Duke of Saxe-Altenburg
- Hans Stohwasser (1914)
- Wilhelm von Tümpling (1866)
- Julius von Verdy du Vernois (1870)
- Antoni Wilhelm Radziwiłł (1866)
- Heinrich von Vietinghoff (1914)
- Karl Graf von Wedel (from 1914, Fürst von Wedel) (1877)
- Helmuth Wilberg (1914)
- Karl Freiherr von Wrangel (1870)
- Ferdinand Graf von Zeppelin (1870)

=== Unspecified ===
- Maximilian von Versen
