= Hans Stohwasser =

- Born: 4 May 1884
- Died: 30 May 1967 (aged 83)
- Military career
- Allegiance: Nazi Germany
- Branch: Kriegsmarine
- Rank: Vizeadmiral
- Conflicts: World War I World War II
- Awards: Knight's Cross of the Iron Cross

Hans Stohwasser (4 May 1884 – 30 May 1967) was a Vizeadmiral in the Kriegsmarine of Nazi Germany. He was a recipient of the Knight's Cross of the Iron Cross.

== Awards ==
- Iron Cross (1914) 2nd Class (27 January 1915) & 1st Class (31 May 1916)
- Hanseatic Cross of Hamburg
- Military Merit Cross of Mecklenburg 2nd Class
- Knight's Cross of the Albert Order of Saxony 1st Class with Swords
- Wehrmacht Long Service Award 4th to 1st Class (2 October 1936)
- Honour Cross of the World War 1914/1918 (11 January 1935)
- Sudetenland Medal (20 December 1939)
- Clasp to the Iron Cross (1939) 2nd Class (26 November 1939) & 1st Class (22 April 1940)
- Minesweepers, Sub-Chasers and Escort-Vessel War Badge (1 September 1940)
- Knight's Cross of the Iron Cross on 30 November 1940 as Konteradmiral and Befehlshaber der Sicherung der Ostsee (Commander of the security of the Baltic Sea)
