= Magnus von Eberhardt =

German general (1855–1939)

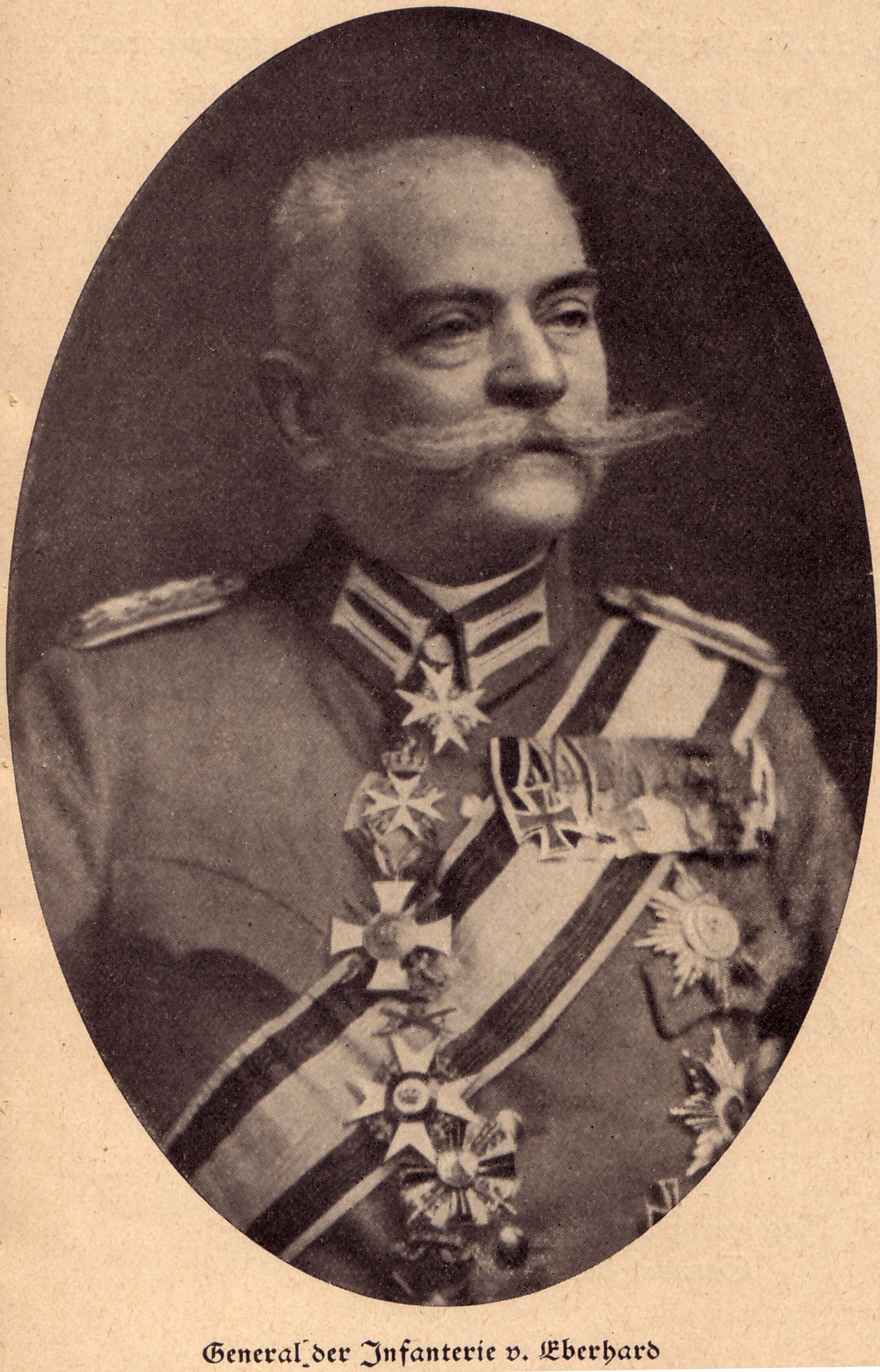
- Born: 6 December 1855; Berlin, Kingdom of Prussia
- Died: 24 January 1939 (aged 83); Berlin, Germany
- Military career
- Allegiance: German Empire
- Branch: Imperial German Army
- Service years: 1874–1918
- Rank: General der Infanterie
- Commands: Guards Fusilier Regiment; 19th Division; XV Reserve Corps; X Reserve Corps; 7th Army; 1st Army
- Conflicts: World War I
- Awards: Pour le Mérite with Oakleaves; Knight of Justice, Order of Saint John (Bailiwick of Brandenburg)

Magnus von Eberhardt (6 December 1855 – 24 January 1939) was a Prussian military officer and a German General der Infanterie during World War I. He received the Pour le Mérite (Prussia's and Germany's highest military honor) with Oakleaves (signifying a second award) and was a Rechtsritter (Knight of Justice) of the Johanniterorden (Order of Saint John).

== Pre war ==
Magnus von Eberhardt was born on 6 December 1855 in Berlin. He began his military career in 1874 (at age 19) as a Sekonde-Lieutenant in the 93rd (Anhalt) Infantry Regiment at Zerbst.

== World War I ==
At the outbreak of the war, von Eberhardt was Military Governor of Straßburg, then in the German Imperial territory of Alsace-Lorraine. On 1 September 1914 he took command of the temporary Corps Eberhardt named for him. On 1 December 1914 it was established as XV Reserve Corps and on 1 September 1916 it was renamed as XV Bavarian Reserve Corps. On 16 October 1916, he transferred to command X Reserve Corps.

In August 1918, he temporarily took command of 7th Army from Max von Boehn on the Western Front before going on to command 1st Army just before the end of the War.

Von Eberhardt was awarded the Pour le Mérite on 20 May 1917. He was awarded the Oakleaves on 22 September 1917.

== Post war ==
In 1919, von Eberhardt was appointed to the defense of Eastern Prussia as commander of the Kulmer Land Defence Forces. In the spring of 1919, he received the order to withdraw from the territory of Soldau and Polish troops took possession.

Von Eberhardt died in Berlin on 24 January 1939 at the age of 83. He was interred in the Invalidenfriedhof.

== Bibliography ==
- Cron, Hermann (2002). Imperial German Army 1914-18: Organisation, Structure, Orders-of-Battle [first published: 1937]. Helion & Co. ISBN 1-874622-70-1.

Military offices
Preceded by Formed as Corps Eberhardt	Commander, XV Reserve Corps; 1 September 1914 – 16 October 1916	Succeeded by General der Artillerie Maximilian von Höhn
Preceded by Generalleutnant Georg Fuchs	Commander, X Reserve Corps; 15 October 1916 – 6 August 1918	Succeeded by Generalleutnant Arthur von Gabain
Preceded by Generaloberst Max von Boehn	Commander, 7th Army; 6 August – 15 October 1918	Succeeded by Generaloberst Max von Boehn
Preceded by General der Infanterie Otto von Below	Commander, 1st Army; 8 November – 1 December 1918	Succeeded by Dissolved
