= 2nd Guards Reserve Division (German Empire) =

Reserve infantry division of the Imperial German Army in World War I

2nd Guards Reserve Division (2. Garde-Reserve-Division)
- Active: 1914-1919
- Country: Germany
- Branch: Army
- Type: Infantry
- Size: Approx. 15,000
- Engagements: World War I: Great Retreat, First Battle of the Marne, Race to the Sea, Battle of the Somme, Battle of Arras (1917), Battle of Passchendaele, German spring offensive

The 2nd Guards Reserve Division (2. Garde-Reserve-Division) was a reserve infantry division of the Imperial German Army in World War I. Despite its name, it was not a reserve formation of the Prussian Guards like the 1st Guards Reserve Division. Instead, other than the 55th Reserve Infantry Regiment, which was raised by the 4th Guards Grenadiers, it was primarily made up of non-Guards reservists from Westphalia and Hanover. It was formed on mobilization in August 1914 as part of X Reserve Corps and dissolved in 1919 during the demobilization of the German Army after the Armistice.

The division spent the entire war on the Western Front. It fought in the First Battle of the Marne in 1914, the Battle of the Somme in 1916, the Battles of Arras and Battle of Passchendaele in 1917, and occupied various parts of the front throughout the war. It participated in the 1918 German spring offensive. It was rated by American Army intelligence in 1918 as a second class division.

== Order of battle on mobilization ==
On mobilization in August 1914, reserve infantry regiments from Westphalia and Hannover, as well as smaller German states adjoining these Prussian provinces, were called up and formed the core of the 2nd Guards Reserve Division. They were joined by artillery, cavalry, and engineer units also from various parts of Germany. The 2nd Guards Reserve Division's initial wartime organization was as follows:

- 26. Reserve-Infanterie-Brigade
  - Westfälisches Reserve-Infanterie-Regiment Nr. 15
  - Westfälisches Reserve-Infanterie-Regiment Nr. 55
- 38. Reserve-Infanterie-Brigade
  - Hannoversches Reserve-Infanterie-Regiment Nr. 77
  - Hannoversches Reserve-Infanterie-Regiment Nr. 91
  - Hannoversches Reserve-Jäger-Bataillon Nr. 10
- Reserve-Ulanen-Regiment Nr. 2
- Reserve-Feldartillerie-Regiment Nr. 20
- 4./Hannoversches Pionier-Bataillon Nr. 10

== Order of battle on February 23, 1918 ==
Divisions underwent many changes during the war, with regiments moving from division to division, and some being destroyed and rebuilt. During the war, most divisions became triangular - one infantry brigade with three infantry regiments rather than two infantry brigades of two regiments (a "square division"). An artillery commander replaced the artillery brigade headquarters, the cavalry was further reduced, the engineer contingent was increased, and a divisional signals command was created. The 2nd Guards Reserve Division's order of battle on February 26, 1918, was as follows:

- 38. Reserve-Infanterie-Brigade
  - Westfälisches Reserve-Infanterie-Regiment Nr. 15
  - Hannoversches Reserve-Infanterie-Regiment Nr. 77
  - Hannoversches Reserve-Infanterie-Regiment Nr. 91
- Maschinengewehr-Scharfschützen-Abteilung Nr. 65
- Kavallerie-Eskadron Nr. 4
- Artillerie-Kommandeur 116
  - Reserve-Feldartillerie-Regiment Nr. 20
  - II.Bataillon/Fußartillerie-Regiment Nr. 23
- Pionier-Bataillon Nr. 302
- 4./Hannoversches Pionier-Bataillon Nr. 10
- 6./Hannoversches Pionier-Bataillon Nr. 10
- 6. Garde-Minenwerfer-Kompanie
- Divisions-Nachrichten-Kommandeur 402
