= X Reserve Corps =

X Reserve Corps X. Reserve-Korps
- Flag of the Staff of a Generalkommando (1871–1918)
- Active: 2 August 1914 - post November 1918
- Country: German Empire
- Type: Corps
- Size: Approximately 38,000 (on formation)
- Engagements: World War I Battle of the Frontiers

Insignia
- Abbreviation: X RK

The X Reserve Corps (German: X. Reserve-Korps / X RK) was a corps level command of the German Army in World War I.

== Formation ==
X Reserve Corps was formed on the outbreak of the war in August 1914 as part of the mobilisation of the Army. It was initially commanded by General der Infanterie Günther Graf von Kirchbach, formerly President of the Military Tribunal. It was still in existence at the end of the war in the 4th Army, Heeresgruppe Kronprinz Rupprecht on the Western Front.

=== Structure on formation ===
On formation in August 1914, X Reserve Corps consisted of two divisions, made up of reserve units. In general, Reserve Corps and Reserve Divisions were weaker than their active counterparts

Reserve Infantry Regiments did not always have three battalions nor necessarily contain a machine gun company
Reserve Jäger Battalions did not have a machine gun company on formation
Reserve Cavalry Regiments consisted of just three squadrons
Reserve Field Artillery Regiments usually consisted of two abteilungen of three batteries each
Corps Troops generally consisted of a Telephone Detachment and four sections of munition columns and trains

In summary, X Reserve Corps mobilised with 25 infantry battalions, 9 machine gun companies (54 machine guns), 6 cavalry squadrons, 12 field artillery batteries (72 guns) and 3 pioneer companies.

Despite its name, 2nd Guards Reserve Division was not formed by units drawn predominantly from the Guards Corps but from II Corps District (divisional cavalry), VII Corps District (26th Reserve Infantry Brigade) and X Corps District (38th Reserve Infantry Brigade, field artillery regiment and pioneers).

Corps	Division	Brigade	Units
X Reserve Corps	2nd Guards Reserve Division	26th Reserve Infantry Brigade	15th Reserve Infantry Regiment
X Reserve Corps	2nd Guards Reserve Division	26th Reserve Infantry Brigade	55th Reserve Infantry Regiment
X Reserve Corps	2nd Guards Reserve Division	38th Reserve Infantry Brigade	77th Reserve Infantry Regiment
X Reserve Corps	2nd Guards Reserve Division	38th Reserve Infantry Brigade	91st Reserve Infantry Regiment
X Reserve Corps	2nd Guards Reserve Division	38th Reserve Infantry Brigade	10th Reserve Jäger Battalion
X Reserve Corps	2nd Guards Reserve Division		2nd Reserve Uhlan Regiment
X Reserve Corps	2nd Guards Reserve Division		20th Reserve Field Artillery Regiment
X Reserve Corps	2nd Guards Reserve Division		4th Company, 10th Pioneer Battalion
X Reserve Corps	2nd Guards Reserve Division		2nd Guards Reserve Divisional Pontoon Train
X Reserve Corps	2nd Guards Reserve Division		2nd Guards Reserve Medical Company
X Reserve Corps	19th Reserve Division	37th Reserve Infantry Brigade	73rd Reserve Infantry Regiment
X Reserve Corps	19th Reserve Division	37th Reserve Infantry Brigade	78th Reserve Infantry Regiment
X Reserve Corps	19th Reserve Division	39th Reserve Infantry Brigade	74th Reserve Infantry Regiment
X Reserve Corps	19th Reserve Division	39th Reserve Infantry Brigade	92nd Reserve Infantry Regiment
X Reserve Corps	19th Reserve Division	39th Reserve Infantry Brigade	III Battalion, 79th Reserve Infantry Regiment
X Reserve Corps	19th Reserve Division		6th Reserve Dragoon Regiment
X Reserve Corps	19th Reserve Division		19th Reserve Field Artillery Regiment
X Reserve Corps	19th Reserve Division		1st Reserve Company, 10th Pioneer Battalion
X Reserve Corps	19th Reserve Division		2nd Reserve Company, 10th Pioneer Battalion
X Reserve Corps	19th Reserve Division		19th Reserve Divisional Pontoon Train
X Reserve Corps	19th Reserve Division		10th Reserve Medical Company
X Reserve Corps	Corps Troops		10th Reserve Telephone Detachment
X Reserve Corps	Corps Troops		Munition Trains and Columns corresponding to the III Reserve Corps

== Combat chronicle ==
On mobilisation, X Reserve Corps was assigned to the 2nd Army as part of the right wing of the forces that invaded France and Belgium as part of the Schlieffen Plan offensive in August 1914.

== Commanders ==
X Reserve Corps had the following commanders during its existence:

From	Rank	Name
2 August 1914	General der Infanterie	Günther Graf von Kirchbach
30 August 1914	General der Infanterie	Johannes von Eben
11 June 1915	Generalleutnant	Robert Kosch
18 August 1916	General der Infanterie	Robert Kosch
28 August 1916	Generalleutnant	Georg Fuchs
15 October 1916	General der Infanterie	Magnus von Eberhardt
6 August 1918	Generalleutnant	Arthur von Gabain

== See also ==
- German Army order of battle (1914)
- German Army order of battle, Western Front (1918)

== Bibliography ==
- Cron, Hermann (2002). Imperial German Army 1914-18: Organisation, Structure, Orders-of-Battle [first published: 1937]. Helion & Co. ISBN 1-874622-70-1.
- Ellis, John; Cox, Michael (1993). The World War I Databook. Aurum Press Ltd. ISBN 1-85410-766-6.
- Busche, Hartwig (1998). Formationsgeschichte der Deutschen Infanterie im Ersten Weltkrieg (1914 bis 1918) (in German). Institut für Preußische Historiographie.
- Histories of Two Hundred and Fifty-One Divisions of the German Army which Participated in the War (1914-1918), compiled from records of Intelligence section of the General Staff, American Expeditionary Forces, at General Headquarters, Chaumont, France 1919. The London Stamp Exchange Ltd. 1989 [1920]. ISBN 0-948130-87-3.
- The German Forces in the Field; 7th Revision, 11th November 1918; Compiled by the General Staff, War Office. Imperial War Museum, London and the Battery Press. 1995 [1918]. ISBN 978-1-870423-95-3.
