= Machault, Ardennes =

Machault
- Commune
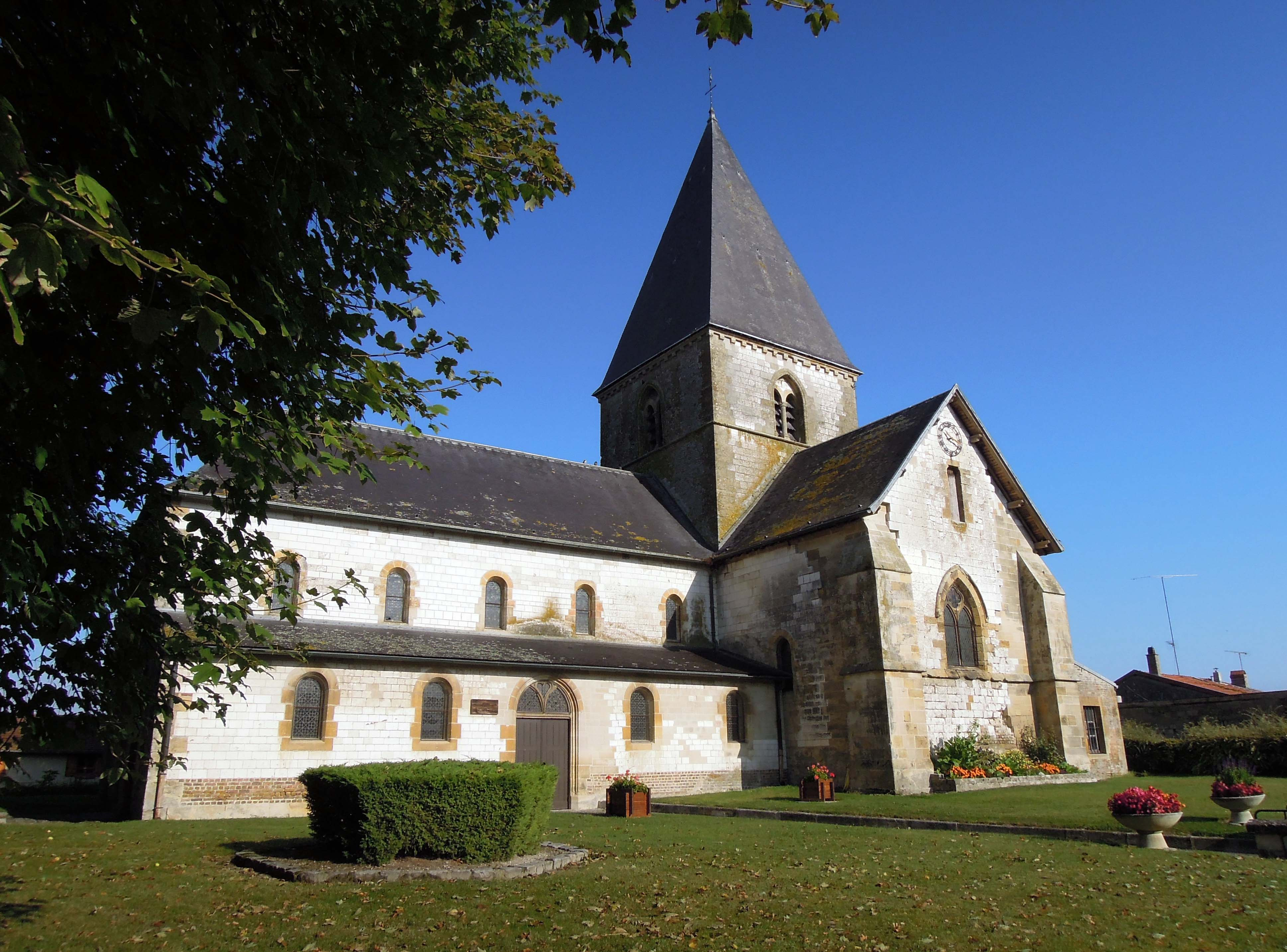
- The church in Machault

- Coat of arms
- Location of Machault
- Location within France Location within Grand Est
- Coordinates: 49°21′20″N 4°30′00″E
- Country: France
- Region: Grand Est
- Department: Ardennes
- Arrondissement: Vouziers
- Canton: Attigny
- Intercommunality: Argonne Ardennaise

Government
  - Mayor (2020–2026): Chantal Pierot
- Area^{1}: 16.58 km^{2} (6.40 sq mi)
- Elevation: 140 m (460 ft)
- Highest elevation: 171 m (561 ft)
- Lowest elevation: 114 m (374 ft)
- Population (2023): 482
  - Density: 29.1/km^{2} (75.3/sq mi)
- Time zone: UTC+01:00 (CET)
  - Summer (DST): UTC+02:00 (CEST)
- INSEE/Postal code: 08264 /08310
- ^{1} French Land Register data, which excludes lakes, ponds, glaciers > 1 km^{2} (0.386 sq mi or 247 acres) and river estuaries.

Machault (French pronunciation: [maʃo]) is a commune in the Ardennes department in northern France.

== Population ==
Historical population
Year	Pop.	±% p.a.
1968	551	—
1975	511	−1.07%
1982	440	−2.11%
1990	459	+0.53%
1999	437	−0.54%
2007	495	+1.57%
2012	503	+0.32%
2017	505	+0.08%
2023	482	−0.77%
Source: INSEE

== See also ==
- Communes of the Ardennes department
