= Lossberg study =

The Lossberg study was a German military plan prepared by Lieutenant Colonel Bernhard von Lossberg and developed under Alfred Jodl and Walter Warlimont in the OKW on September 15, 1940. Its northward direction of attack on the Soviet Union was favoured in the Barbarossa Plan, signed by Adolf Hitler. Key paragraphs:

"To conduct the operations first it's necessary to decide whether the main strike direction would be northward or southward to the Pripet Marshes ... The advantages of aiming the main strike northward are as follows:

- much better concentration possibilities (railroads)
- interest in inflicting a prompt defeat on Russians in Baltic states
- relatively better road conditions at operational direction
- cooperation possibility with XXI Group, acting from Finland
- attainability of Leningrad and Moscow

The advantages of aiming the main strike southward are:

- threatened area of Romania
- possibility of supplying the German motorized units upon Romanian and Galician oil fields (however much worse communications after crossing the Russian border)
- significance of Ukraine.

Suggestion is to choose the main strike direction northwardly."

"How the cooperation of both main groups eastward from the Pripet Marshes will be organized henceforth and how the ultimate military goal will look like depends at great extent on whether the collapse of Russia after initial German successes takes place or not, and when". Similar arguments for northern direction were made on November 26 in German General Staff project.
