= 84th Infantry Division (German Empire) =

84th Infantry Division (84. Infanterie-Division)
- Active: 1914-1919
- Country: German Empire
- Branch: Army
- Type: Infantry
- Size: Approx. 12,500
- Engagements: World War I: Battle of Łódź (1914)

The 84th Infantry Division (84. Infanterie-Division) was a formation of the Imperial German Army in World War I. The division was formed in November 1914 as the "Division Posen 2", part of the Posen Corps (Korps Posen), and became the 84th Infantry Division in June 1915. It was initially formed from the garrison infantry regiments of Fortress Posen (Festung Posen). The division was disbanded in 1919 during the demobilization of the German Army after World War I.

== Combat chronicle ==
Division Posen 2 initially served on the Eastern Front, fighting in Poland, including at the 1914 Battle of Łódź, and then spent most of the period until mid-1915 fighting along the Rawka and Bzura Rivers. On June 2, 1915, it became the 84th Infantry Division. It fought around Warsaw in July and August 1915 and then in the pursuit of retreating Russian forces. From September 1915 to July 1916, it occupied the line along the Servech and Shchara Rivers. From July 1916 to June 1917, it occupied the line along the Berezina, Olshanka and Krevljanka Rivers. It remained there and along the Servech and Neman Rivers until the armistice on the Eastern Front. At the end of December 1917, the division was sent to the Western Front. It occupied the line by Verdun from January to May 1918 and then moved to the Somme region. It remained in the line until the end of the war. Allied intelligence rated the division as fourth class.

== Order of battle on formation ==
The 84th Infantry Division was formed as a square division. The order of battle of the division on June 14, 1915, was as follows:

- 167. Infanterie-Brigade
  - Infanterie-Regiment Nr. 333
  - Infanterie-Regiment Nr. 334
- 168. Infanterie-Brigade
  - Infanterie-Regiment Nr. 335
  - Infanterie-Regiment Nr. 336
- Kavallerie-Regiment Nr. 84
- Stab Reserve-Feldartillerie-Regiment Nr. 6
  - 3. Ersatz-Abteilung/1. Posensches Feldartillerie-Regiment Nr. 20
  - 6.Batterie/Reserve-Fußartillerie-Regiment Nr. 25
  - 5.Batterie/Reserve-Fußartillerie-Regiment Nr. 26
- Landwehr-Pionier-Kompanie/XII. Armeekorps

== Late-war order of battle ==
The division underwent a number of organizational changes over the course of the war. It was triangularized in November 1916, losing the 167th Infantry Brigade and its two regiments and gaining the 423rd Infantry Regiment. Cavalry was reduced, artillery and signals commands were formed, and combat engineer support was expanded to a full pioneer battalion. The order of battle on January 10, 1918, was as follows:

- 168. Infanterie-Brigade
  - Infanterie-Regiment Nr. 335
  - Infanterie-Regiment Nr. 336
  - Infanterie-Regiment Nr. 423
- 3. Eskadron/2. Hannoversches Dragoner-Regiment Nr. 16
- Artillerie-Kommandeur 54
  - Feldartillerie-Regiment Nr. 248
  - III.Bataillon/Fußartillerie-Regiment Nr. 25 (from June 10, 1918)
- Stab Pionier-Bataillon Nr. 84
  - 2.Reserve-Kompanie/Pionier-Bataillon Nr. 1
  - Pionier-Kompanie Nr. 272
  - Minenwerfer-Kompanie Nr. 84
- Divisions-Nachrichten-Kommandeur 84
