= Max von Boehn (general) =

Prussian officer (1850–1921)

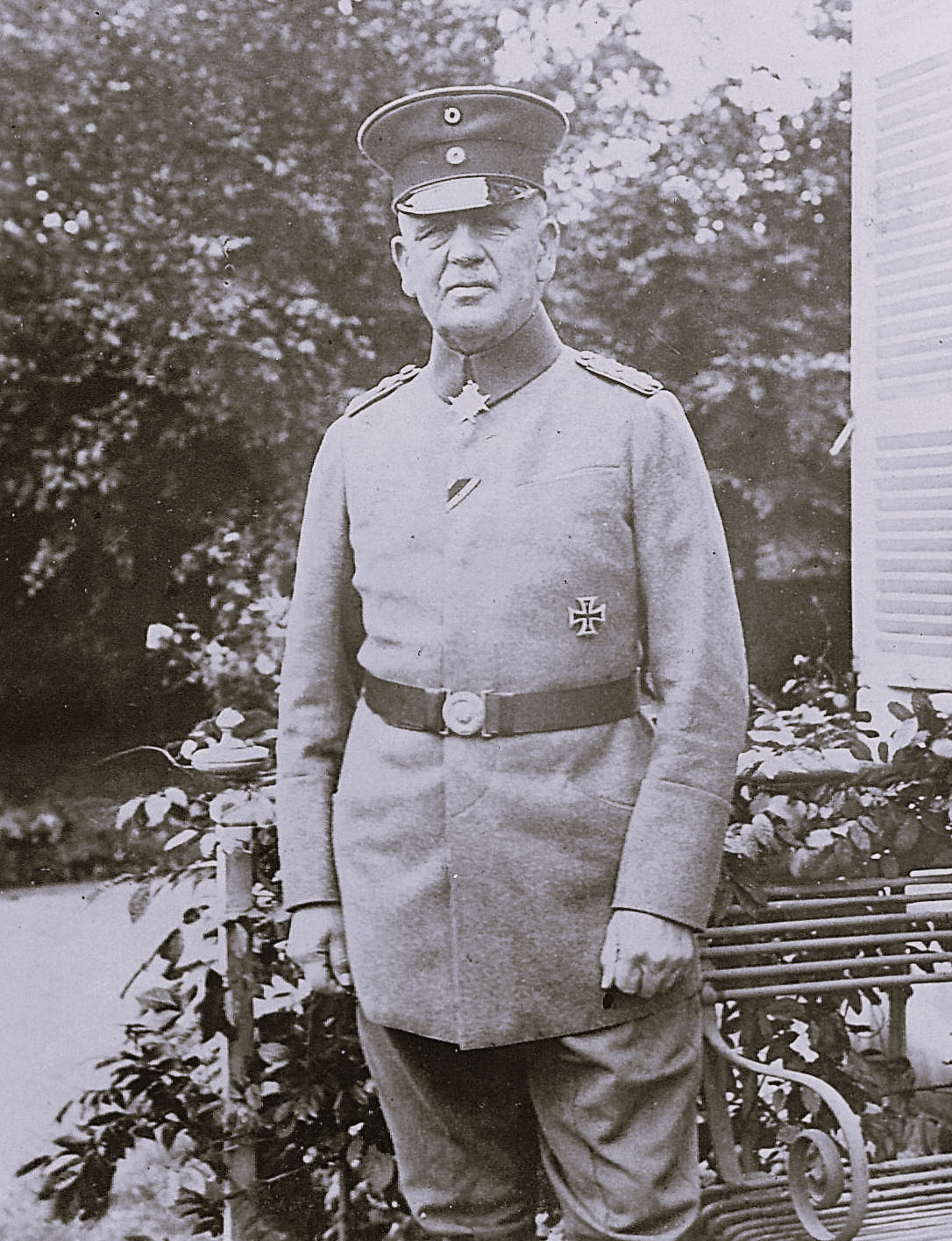
- Boehn in 1917
- Born: 16 August 1850; Bromberg, Province of Posen, Kingdom of Prussia, German Confederation (now Bydgoszcz, Kuyavian-Pomerania, Poland)
- Died: 18 February 1921 (aged 70); Sommerfeld, Free State of Prussia, Weimar Republic (now Lubsko, Lubusz Voivodeship, Poland)
- Relatives: Julius Heinrich von Boehn
- Military career
- Allegiance: Kingdom of Prussia (1867–1918); German Empire (1871–1918); Weimar Republic (1918–1919)
- Branch: Prussian Army; Imperial German Army; Reichsheer
- Service years: 1867–1919
- Rank: Generaloberst
- Commands: Infantry Regiment No. 76; 18th Division; IX Reserve Corps; Army Detachment C; 7th Army; Army Group Boehn
- Conflicts: Franco-Prussian War; First World War
- Awards: Pour le Mérite; Order of the Black Eagle

Max Ferdinand Karl von Boehn (16 August 1850 − 18 February 1921) was a Prussian and German officer who served in the Franco-Prussian War and World War I. He reached the rank of Generaloberst and held several high commands in World War I. He was decorated with the Pour le Mérite with Oakleaves, Prussia's highest award for military valor.

== Life ==
=== Early life ===
Max von Boehn was born in Bromberg, Kingdom of Prussia (modern Bydgoszcz, Poland) into the Pomeranian noble family von Boehn. He was the son of the later Prussian Lieutenant General Julius Heinrich von Boehn (1820–1893) and his wife Luise Henriette Josepha, née Cords (17 November 1830 Mischwitz at Hohensalza − 19 August 1883 in Berlin). His younger brother, Hans von Boehn (1853–1931) also embarked on a military career, rising to the rank of General der Kavallerie (General of Cavalry). The Prussian General der Infanterie and commanding general of the VI. Army Corps, Oktavio Philipp von Boehn (1824–1899) was their uncle. Boehn attended schools in Thorn, Stolp and Berlin,

=== Military career ===
Boehn joined the 3rd Regiment of Foot Guards of the Prussian Army as a three-year volunteer on 6 December 1867 at Hanover. Boehn attainted his officer's commission on 15 June and was appointed to Portepeefähnrich on 7 July 1868. Boehn was commissioned a Sekondelieutenant (second lieutenant) on 9 March 1869. On 4 February 1870, he was transferred to Hamburg, with the 8th Company of the (2nd Hanseatic) Infantry Regiment No. 76.

==== Franco-Prussian War ====
During the Franco-Prussian War of 1870–1871, Boehn participated in the Sieges of Metz, Toul, and Paris as well as the battles at Dreux, Bellême and partially at La Madeleine-Bouvet. He was slightly wounded at the Battle of Loigny by a shot in his right arm and awarded the Prussian Iron Cross 2nd Class and the Mecklenburg-Schwerin Military Merit Cross 2nd Class for his achievements.

==== Later career ====
From 13 May 1872 to 1 October 1875, Boehn was appointed adjutant of the II. Battalion. A month later, he became an adjutant at the Bezirks-Kommando (military district headquarters) in Hamburg for two years. Boehn was temporarily assigned to the First Battalion of the 2nd Hanseatic Landwehr Regiment No. 76, and was promoted to the rank of Premierlieutenant (first lieutenant) on 11 January 1876. From 1 August through 16 November 1878, he attended a course at the Militär-Schießschule. On 22 March 1881, he was ordered to be transferred to the newly formed Infantry Regiment No. 97, effective 1 April 1881. From 16 June 1881 to 14 October 1882, Boehn was à la suite of Infantry Regiment No. 97 and adjutant of the 2nd Grand Ducal Hessian 50th Infantry Brigade in Darmstadt. On 22 June 1882, he was made à la suite of 4th Regiment of Foot Guards while remaining in his assignment as brigade adjutant.

On 1 August 1882, Boehn was promoted to supernumary Hauptmann (captain) and on 14 October, he was transferred to the Kaiser Alexander Guards Grenadier Regiment No. 1 in Berlin, where he served as a company commander of 12th Company. On 11 October 1888, Boehn became an adjutant on the staff of the 1st Guards Infantry Division in Berlin. On 22 May 1889, he received a Patent as Hauptmann of 1 August 1880, and on 21 September 1889, he was promoted to Major. On 29 July 1890, Boehn became adjutant to the General Command of the Guards Corps. Boehn then returned to field command, being appointed commander of the Fusilier-Battalion in Kaiser Alexander Guards Grenadier Regiment No. 1, on 27 January 1892. As a staff officer in charge of budgets, Boehn was assigned to the 3rd Regiment of Foot Guards on 13 May 1895. On 18 June 1895, he was promoted to Oberstleutnant (lieutenant colonel).

On 20 July 1897, Boehn was appointed temporary commander of Infantry Regiment Hamburg (2nd Hanseatic) No. 76 and, with his promotion to Oberst (colonel) on 18 November 1897, formally named as regimental commander. On 18 May 1901, Boehn was tasked with the leadership of the 9th Infantry Brigade in Frankfurt (Oder) and, with his promotion to Generalmajor (major general) on 16 June, formally named commander of the brigade. He was ordered to attend the Field Artillery School information course at Jüterbog in May 1904. On 22 April 1905, Boehn was promoted to Generalleutnant (lieutenant general) and named commander of the 18th division in Flensburg.

On 1 September 1909, Boehn was promoted to General der Infanterie (General of the Infantry). He succeeded Wilhelm von Uslar as governor of the Fortress of Ulm on 2 December 1909. King Wilhelm II of Württemberg awarded him the Grand Cross of the Friedrich Order in June 1911. On 21 September 1912, Boehn was retired with pension and named à la suite of Infantry Regiment Hamburg (2nd Hanseatic) No. 76. He spent his retirement in Naumburg.

==== World War I ====
With the mobilization at the outbreak of World War I, Boehn was reactivated as a General of Infantry zur Disposition and appointed the commanding general of the IX Reserve Corps. Called the "North Army," its first duty was protecting the coast in Schleswig-Holstein, as well as the strategically important Kaiser Wilhelm Canal, from a possible invasion, until 22 August 1914. After these initial fears were found groundless, the corps was transferred to Belgium on 23 August. On 25 August in Leuven, units under his command were involved in skirmishes with Belgian francs-tireurs that would later be reported as war crimes. Battles followed near Mechelen and around the Fortress Termonde, until major formations came to the aid of the beleaguered army's right wing from Saint-Quentin. On 14 September, the corps reached Noyon and advanced toward Carlepont. In October 1914, the front stabilized between Roye and Noyon, followed by struggles at Laucourt. Beginning in January 1915, the IX Reserve Corps was deployed for the Battle of Soissons.

From the end of August until 17 September 1915, Boehn also served as acting commander of the 1st Army. After that army's disbandment on 17 September, the IX Reserve Corps was subordinated to the 2nd Army and later on 21 October 1915 to the 6th Army. This was followed by trench warfare in Flanders and Artois. The Battle of Verdun began on 21 February 1916 and at Angres, the so-called "Gießler Height" was stormed. Fights at Givenchy followed. Reporting to the re-formed 1st Army on 19 July 1916, the IX Reserve Corps participated in the Battle of the Somme. For the defensive success of his troops in the fighting, Boehn was decorated with the Pour le Mérite, Prussia's highest award for military valor, on 24 August 1916. From 25 August, the corps fought with the 6th Army again in Flanders and Artois, before returning to the Somme on 26 September 1916. From 26 October, the corps was with the 4th Army in position for the battles on the Yser.

On 10 September 1914, Army Detachment Strantz had been formed from other depleted corps, taking its name from its commander, Hermann von Strantz. On 2 February 1917, the group was renamed Army Detachment C and Boehn was named its new commanding general. Under his command, the detachment fought on the Maas Heights. On 11 March 1917, Boehn was transferred as commanding general to the 7th Army. Under his leadership, the army was deployed to the Winter Battle of Champagne, the position battles on the Aisne and the double battle of the Aisne and Champagne. After heavy fighting on the Chemin des Dames and repeatedly foiling attempts by French forces to break through, Boehn was decorated on 20 May 1917 with the Oakleaves to the Pour le Mérite. Later in the year, the army was involved in the north of the Ailette and in October at the Battle of Malmaison.

Max von Boehn celebrated on 5 December 1917 in Marle the 50th anniversary of his military service. The Kaiser also honored him with the award of the Grand Cross of the Order of the Red Eagle with Oakleaves and Swords.

On 22 March 1918, at the beginning of German spring offensive or Kaiserschlacht in France, Boehn was promoted to Generaloberst (Colonel General). During the German offensive, the army penetrated to the west but had ceased their advance on 6 April. On 27 May, he was able to proceed aggressively again, overcoming the Chemin des Dames, the Aisne-Marne Canal, the Aisne and the Vesle. Boehn further managed to conquer the forts on the West Front of Reims. Within days, Boehn's units had achieved territorial gains of 60 kilometres (37 mi) depth, captured 60,000 prisoners of war and seized 830 artillery pieces and 2,000 machine guns. For these achievements, Wilhelm II appointed him Chief of the Schleswig-Holstein Infantry Regiment No. 163 on 30 May 1918. Six days later, in Fressancourt, Boehn welcomed his regiment, which had been transferred from the 4th to the 7th Army. Boehn was also decorated with the Order of the Black Eagle.

Assault warfare again switched to trench warfare, and Boehn's army fought between the Oise, Aisne and Marne. A final assault battle of the Marne and in Champagne developed into a defensive battle between Soissons and Reims and between Marne and Vesle. In the end the German troops were driven back to a line before the Spring Offensive.

On 6 August 1918 Boehn was appointed the Commander-in-Chief of Army Group Boehn which was formed on 12 August 1918 from the 2nd, 9th, and 18th Armies to defend the Siegfried Line (Hindenburg Line) in the southern Artois between Oise and Somme. It was the last of its kind in this war. When the superiority of the Allies forced the surrender of the Army Group, it was dissolved on 8 October 1918. Boehn received at his request on 31 October 1918 the command of the 7th Army. After fighting in the Antwerp–Meuse position, the cease fire ending the war was proclaimed on 11 November 1918 at Compiègne.

Boehn led his command out of France at the end of November 1918 and reached Marburg. Boehn's units were demobilized on 18 January and he was decommissioned on 27 January 1919. After his retirement, he lived in Charlottenburg. The local "Association of Officers of the former Kaiser Alexander Garde Grenadier Regiment No. 1" appointed him its honorary chairman. Boehn died at age 70 in Sommerfeld and was interred at the Invalids' Cemetery in Berlin. His burial place, like that of his father, has not been preserved.

=== Family ===
Boehn married Martha Elsner (born 2 March 1854 in Groß Rosenburg Castle in Sommerfeld) on 25 September 1873 in Groß Rosenburg. Four children were born:

- Volkhart (born 23 June 1874 in Hamburg; died 7 January 1937 in Potsdam), German Major
- Wanda (born 14 November 1878 in Schwerin; died 16 November 1971 in Berlin)
- Josepha (born 26 May 1883 in Berlin, died 20 September 1946 in Coburg)
- Armgard (born 4 December 1885 in Berlin, died 22 April 1971 in Munich)

=== Boehn Barracks ===
After the First World War, the Treaty of Versailles reduced the German army and caused the city of Hamburg to be demilitarized for nearly 15 years. The old military barracks in the city were then mostly used for social purposes. This would change in 1935 with the expansion of the Wehrmacht under the Third Reich. Hamburg soon became a major garrison city within the Reich.

In 1936, a new barracks complex began construction in Hamburg-Rahlstedt. The barracks were named the Boehn-Kaserne (Boehn Barracks) and upon completion in March 1938 assigned to the Wehrmacht's Infantry Regiment 76, which carried the same number as the older Infantry Regiment Hamburg (2nd Hanseatic) No. 76 that Boehn had commanded from 1897 to 1901. During World War II, the barracks, besides its military uses, also housed a hospital for the civilian population of Hamburg. After the war, the barracks complex were used by the British Army and as a displaced persons camp, before returning to German army use with the formation of the Bundeswehr. From 1959 to 1993, the Boehn-Kaserne was headquarters of Panzergrenadierbrigade 17. The Boehn-Kaserne was closed on 30 September 1993.

After plans to convert the Boehn-Kaserne into a police barracks were abandoned, the complex was used to house refugees and asylum seekers and was later converted to private housing. Only the monument at Dammtor, a memorial stone in the Boehn-Kaserne opposite the former headquarters building of Panzergrenadierbrigade 17, and a bronze relief on the officer's home, remain to commemorate Infantry Regiment No. 76. In addition, the building contains a stone relief depicting Max von Boehn.

== Decorations and awards ==
- Kingdom of Prussia:
  - Order Pour le Mérite (24 August 1916) with Oakleaves (20 May 1917)
  - Order of the Black Eagle 04.08.1918
  - Order of the Red Eagle, Grand Cross with Oakleaves and Swords.
  - Order of the Crown, 1st Class (18 January 1909)
  - Royal House Order of Hohenzollern, Cross and Star of a Commander with Swords
  - Iron Cross 2nd Class (1870) with 25th anniversary oakleaves
  - Iron Cross 1st Class (7 September 1914)
  - Service Decoration Cross for 25 years' service
  - War Commemorative Medal of 1870–1871
  - Kaiser Wilhelm I. Memorial Medal (Centenary Medal)
- Grand Duchy of Baden: Order of Berthold the First, Grand Cross with Swords (9 January 1918)
- Kingdom of Bavaria: Military Merit Order, 1st Class with Swords (26 January 1917)
- Free and Hanseatic City of Bremen: Hanseatic Cross
- Duchy of Brunswick: War Merit Cross, 2nd Class (22 March 1917)
- Free and Hanseatic City of Hamburg: Hanseatic Cross
- Free and Hanseatic City of Lübeck: Hanseatic Cross (2 January 1915)
- Grand Duchy of Mecklenburg-Schwerin:
  - Military Merit Cross, 2nd Class (1870)
  - Military Merit Cross, 1st Class (24 December 1914)
- Grand Duchy of Mecklenburg-Strelitz: Cross 1st Class for Distinction in War
- Grand Duchy of Oldenburg:
  - House and Merit Order of Peter Frederick Louis, Grand Cross (October 1905)
  - Friedrich August Cross, 2nd Class
- Saxon Duchies: Ducal Saxe-Ernestine House Order, Grand Cross with Swords (1 April 1915)
- Kingdom of Württemberg: Friedrich Order, Grand Cross (June 1911)
- Austria-Hungary: Order of the Iron Crown, 3rd Class
- Kingdom of Belgium: Order of Leopold, Commander
- Kingdom of Italy: Order of Saints Maurice and Lazarus, Officer
- Russian Empire: Order of Saint Anna, 2nd Class
- Kingdom of Siam: Order of the White Elephant, Commander

== Sources ==
=== Literature ===
- Karl-Friedrich Hildebrand, Christian Zweng: The Knight of the Order Pour le Mérite the First World War. Volume 1: A-G. Biblio Verlag. Osnabrück 1999. ISBN 3-7648-2505-7. S. 139–141.
- Walter Killy: German Biographical Encyclopedia. 1995. ISBN 978-3-598-23160-5.
- Hanns Möller: History of the Knights of the Order Pour le Mérite in World War II. Volume I: AL. Publisher Bernard & Graefe. Berlin 1934. pp. 108–110.
- Thomas Nigel: The German Army in World War I. Oxford: Osprey 2003 ISBN 978-1-84176-565-5.
- Fritz Willich: Boehn, Max Ferdinand Carl von. In: New German Biography (NDB). Volume 2, Duncker & Humblot, Berlin 1955, ISBN 3-428-00183-4, S. 395 (digitized).
- Oskar von Lindequist:. Commemorative sheets for rank-list of Kaiser Alexander Guard Grenadiers Edition 1. Publisher Moeser.
- Soldiers Yearbook 1971, p 189th
- Officer strain list of royal Prussian 3rd Foot Guards on foot. From 1860 to 1910. Publisher Gerhard Stalling. Oldenburg 1910. p. 20
- Harry Rege: Officer strain list of Infantry Regiment Nr. 76 ; 1902, No. 9, page 9

Military offices
Preceded by General der Infanterie Hermann von Strantz	Commander, Armee-Abteilung Strantz; 4 February – 15 March 1917	Succeeded by Generalleutnant Georg Fuchs
Preceded by General der Artillerie Richard von Schubert	Commander, 7th Army; 11 March 1917 – 6 August 1918	Succeeded by General der Infanterie Magnus von Eberhardt
Preceded by General der Infanterie Magnus von Eberhardt	Commander, 7th Army; 15 October – December 1918	Succeeded by Dissolved
