= Army Group Boehn =

- Heeresgruppe Boehn
- Active: 12 August - 8 October 1918
- Disbanded: 8 October 1918
- Country: German Empire

Commanders
- Notable commanders: Max von Boehn

The Army Group Boehn (German: Heeresgruppe Boehn) was an Army Group of the German Army, which operated on the Western Front under command of Max von Boehn, between 12 August 1918 and 8 October 1918 during World War I.

== Composition ==
- German 9th Army (Adolph von Carlowitz) (until 18 September)
- German 2nd Army (Georg von der Marwitz then Adolph von Carlowitz)
- German 18th Army (Oskar von Hutier)

== Sources ==
- The Soldier's Burden
- Die Deutschen Heeresgruppen im Ersten Weltkrieg
- : Die deutschen Heeresgruppen Teil 1, Erster Weltkrieg
