= Traugott von Sauberzweig =

German general during the First World War

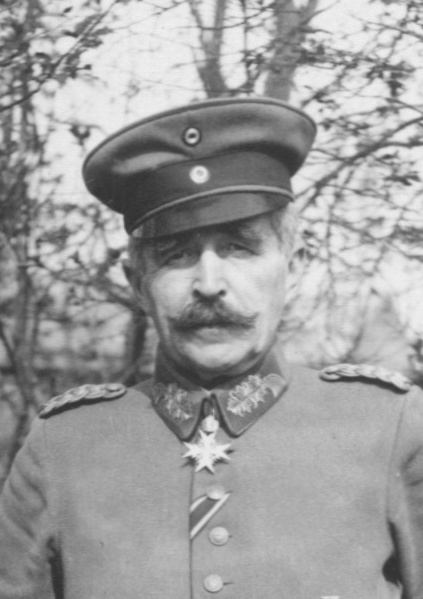
- Born: 28 October 1863; Greiffenberg, Kingdom of Prussia
- Died: 14 April 1920 (aged 56); Kassel, Weimar Republic
- Military career
- Allegiance: German Empire
- Branch: Imperial German Army
- Service years: 1881–1919
- Rank: Generalleutnant
- Commands: Chief of Staff, Army Group Gallwitz; 38th Infantry Division
- Conflicts: World War I
- Awards: Pour le Mérite with oak leaves

Traugott Martin von Sauberzweig (October 28, 1863 to April 14, 1920, in Kassel) was a Prussian Generalleutnant (Lieutenant General) who served on both the Eastern and Western Front in the German Army during World War I. In 1915 he had been Military Governor of Brussels in the days of Edith Cavell's execution, and in connection with this incident his name was prominently mentioned. The Cavell case was the reason that von Sauberzweig was supplanted. He served as chief of staff on the 8th Army in Ukraine in 1916 and was awarded the Pour le Mérite on 6 September 1917.

== Assignments and Commands (pre-War) ==
- 02.1883 Leutnant
- 04.1911 III. Armeekorps - Berlin (von Bülow's Chief of Staff)
- 04.1913 Grenadier-Regiment Prinz Karl von Preußen (2. Brandenburgisches) Nr. 12 - Frankfurt an der Oder (Cdr)
- 02.1914 XI. Armeekorps - Kassel (von Plüskow's Chief of Staff)

== Assignments and Commands (during World War I) ==
- 08.1914 XI. Armeekorps = 3. Armee (von Plüskow's Chief of Staff)
- 07.1915 III. Reserve-Korps (von Karlowitz' Chief of Staff)
- 11.1916 8. Armee (von Mudra's Chief of Staff)
- 07.1917 Heeresgruppe Eichhorn - Wilna (von Eichhorn's Chief of Staff)
- 09.1917 10. Armee (von Eichhorn's Chief of Staff) (concurrent with above)
- 07.1918 Generalleutnant
- 11.1918 Heeresgruppe Gallwitz - Verdun (von Gallwitz' Chief of Staff)
- 12.1918 38. Infanterie-Division (Commander)

== Literature ==
- Karl-Friedrich Hildebrand/Christian Zweng Die Ritter des Ordens Pour le Mérite 1740–1918; ISBN 3-7648-2503-0
- Karl-Friedrich Hildebrand/Christian Zweng Die Ritter des Ordens Pour le Mérite des I. Weltkriegs Band 2: H-O, ISBN 3-7648-2516-2
- van Wyngarden, G (2006). Early German Aces of World War I, Osprey Publishing Ltd. ISBN 1-84176-997-5
- Formationsgeschichte und Stellenbesetzung der deutsche Streitkraefte 1815 -1990 (1990) ISBN 3-7648-1779-8
