= Army Group Hindenburg =

German army group during the First World War

The Army Group Hindenburg (German: Heeresgruppe Hindenburg) was an Army Group of the German Army, which operated in the Baltics against Russia between 5 August 1915 and 30 July 1916 during World War I, under command of Ober Ost Paul von Hindenburg.

It was renamed Army Group Eichhorn when Hermann von Eichhorn replaced Hindenburg on 3 July 1916 and remained in place until 30 March 1918.

== Composition August 1915 ==
- German Army of the Niemen (Otto von Below) (Dissolved Dec 1915)
- German 8th Army (Friedrich von Scholtz)
- German 10th Army (Hermann von Eichhorn)
- German 12th Army (Max von Gallwitz then Max von Fabeck)

== Composition January 1916 ==
- German Armee-Abteilung D (Friedrich von Scholtz)
- German 8th Army (Otto von Below)
- German 10th Army (Hermann von Eichhorn)
- German 12th Army (Max von Gallwitz then Max von Fabeck) (dissolved Oct 1916)

== Composition September 1916 - March 1918 ==
- German Armee-Abteilung D (Friedrich von Scholtz then Oskar von Hutier then Günther von Kirchbach then Hans von Kirchbach)
- German 8th Army (Bruno von Mudra then Friedrich von Scholtz then Oskar von Hutier then Günther von Kirchbach)
- German 10th Army (Hermann von Eichhorn)

== Sources ==
- The Soldier's Burden
- Bundesarchiv : Die deutschen Heeresgruppen Teil 1, Erster Weltkrieg
- Genealogy.net
