= Meuse–Argonne offensive =

1918 campaign of World War I

- Part of the Hundred Days Offensive of World War I
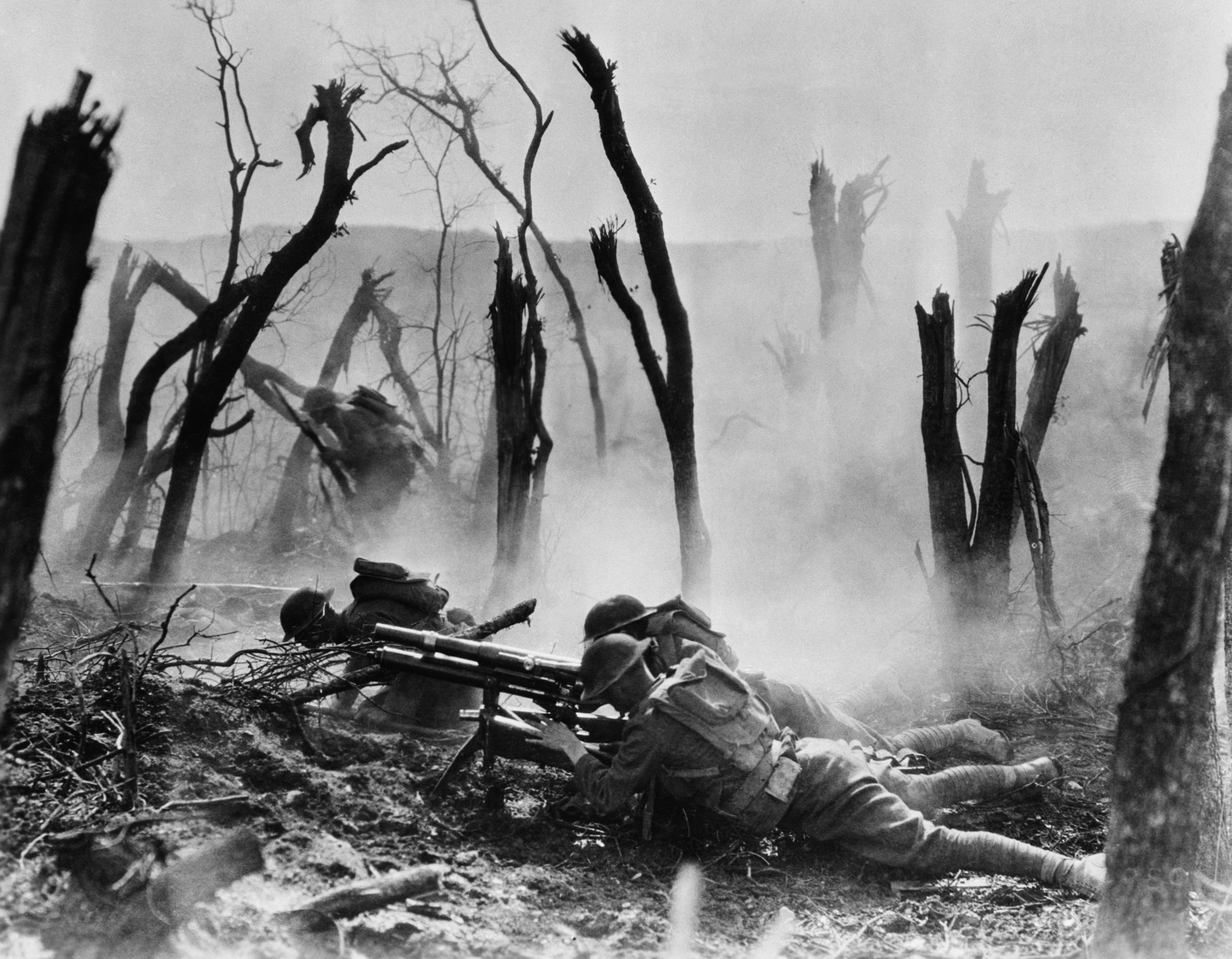
- U.S. Army gun crew from Regimental Headquarters Company, 23rd Infantry, 2nd Division, firing a 37mm gun during an advance against German entrenched positions.
| Date | September 26 – November 11, 1918 |
| Location | Near Montfaucon, northwest of Verdun (present-day Grand Est region), France 49°16′21″N 5°08′31″E |
| Result | Allied victory: End of World War I |
| Territorial changes | French forces advance 32 km and liberate Le Chesne and Sedan; American forces advance 16 km |

Belligerents
| France; United States; Siam | Germany |

Commanders and leaders
| (United States) John J. Pershing (French Third Republic) Paul Maistre (French Third Republic) Henri Gouraud (French Third Republic) Henri Berthelot (United States) Hunter Liggett (United States) Robert Bullard | (German Empire) Paul von Hindenburg (German Empire) Erich Ludendorff (German Empire) Wilhelm of Prussia (German Empire) Max von Gallwitz (German Empire) Albrecht, Duke of Württemberg |

Units involved
| (French Third Republic) Army Group Centre: (French Third Republic) Fourth Army; (French Third Republic) Fifth Army; (United States) American Expeditionary Forces: (United States) First Army; (United States) Second Army; Siamese Expeditionary Forces | (German Empire) Army Group German Crown Prince (German Empire) Army Group Gallwitz (German Empire) Army Group Duke Albrecht |

Strength
| c. 2,000,000 personnel; (United States) 1,200,000 personnel; 380 tanks; 840 planes; 2,780 artillery pieces; (French Third Republic) 800,000 personnel; 652 tanks; 2,766 artillery pieces; 850 personnel | 450,000 personnel |

Casualties and losses
| 192,000 casualties; (United States) 122,063; 26,277 killed; 95,786 wounded; (French Third Republic) 70,000 casualties; 19 killed | 126,000 casualties; 28,000 dead; 42,000 wounded; 56,000 captured; 26,000 taken by Americans; 30,000 POWs taken by French; 874 artillery pieces captured by both |
- Location within France

The Meuse–Argonne offensive (also known as the Meuse River–Argonne Forest offensive, the Battles of the Meuse–Argonne, and the Meuse–Argonne campaign) was a major part of the final Allied offensive of World War I that stretched along the entire Western Front. It was fought from September 26, 1918, until the Armistice of November 11, 1918, a total of 47 days. The Meuse–Argonne offensive was the largest in United States military history, involving 1.2 million American soldiers, sailors and marines, along with 800,000 French and 850 Siamese personnel. It is also the deadliest campaign in the history of the United States Army, resulting in over 300,000 casualties, including 28,000 German lives, 26,277 American lives and an unknown number of French lives. American losses were worsened by the inexperience of many of the troops, the tactics used during the early phases of the operation, and the widespread onset of the Spanish flu.

The offensive was the primary engagement of the American Expeditionary Forces (AEF) in World War I and part of the Allies' Hundred Days Offensive that ended the war. It was the AEF's largest and bloodiest operation of the war, though relatively limited in scale compared to other Western Front battles and secondary to the main Allied offensive axis.

== Overview ==
The logistical prelude to the Meuse attack was planned by American Colonel George C. Marshall who managed to move American units to the front after the Battle of Saint-Mihiel (Saint-Mihiel is a town on the river Meuse, the most important water obstacle on the Western Front). The Allied breakthroughs (north, center, and east) across the length of the front line in September and October 1918 — including the Battle of the Argonne Forest — are now lumped together as part of what is generally remembered as the Grand Offensive (also known as the Hundred Days Offensive) by the Allies on the Western Front. The Meuse–Argonne offensive also involved troops from France, while the rest of the Allies, including France, Britain and its dominion and imperial armies (mainly Canada, Australia, and New Zealand), and Belgium contributed to major battles in more northwestern sectors of the Western Front, including the Hindenburg line.

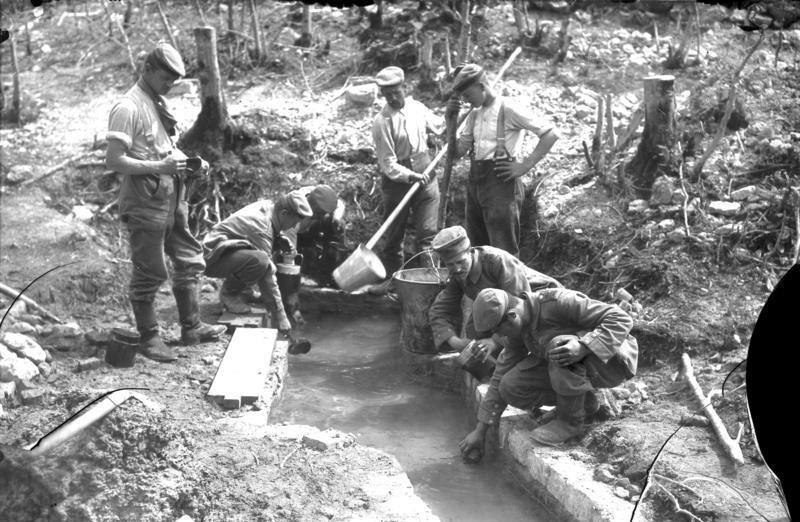
German soldiers drawing water in the Argonne, May 1915

After Operation Michael, the 1918 German offensive, began well but ended with the disaster of Reims in front of the French and at Amiens to British forces. The French and British armies systematically pushed back a German army whose efficiency was decreasing rapidly. Before the offensive, the German soldiers had occupied the Meuse-Argonne area for years, including the east side of Meuse River and the Argonne Forest. They built fortified trenches and machine gun posts within the forest. British, French, and Belgian advances in the northwestern sectors of the front, along with the French–American advances around the Argonne Forest, are credited for leading directly to the Armistice of November 11, 1918. On September 26, the Americans began their strike north toward Sedan. The next day, British and Belgian divisions drove toward Ghent, Belgium. British and French armies attacked across northern France on September 28. The scale of the overall offensive, bolstered by the fresh and eager but largely untried and inexperienced U.S. troops, signaled renewed vigor among the Allies and sharply dimmed German hopes for victory.

The Meuse–Argonne battle was the largest frontline commitment of troops by the U.S. Army in World War I, and also its deadliest. Command was coordinated, with some U.S. troops (e.g. the Buffalo Soldiers of the 92nd Division and the 93rd Division) attached and serving under French command (e.g. XVII Corps during the second phase).

== Prelude ==
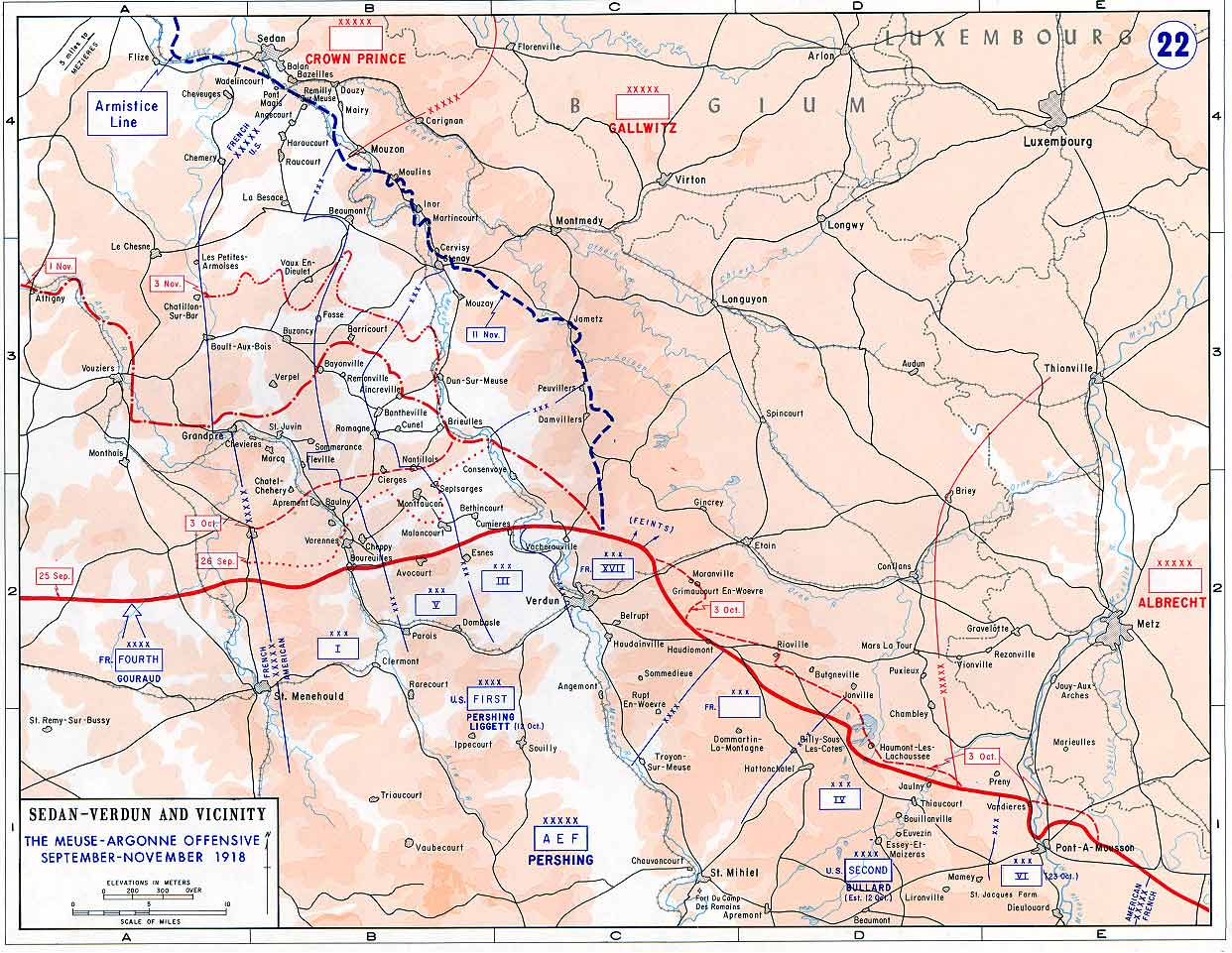
Sedan–Verdun and vicinity: The Meuse–Argonne offensive, September–November 1918 (c. 1938)

=== Opposing forces ===
The American forces initially consisted of 15 divisions of the U.S. First Army commanded by General John J. Pershing until October 16 and then by Lieutenant General Hunter Liggett. The logistics were planned and directed by then Colonel George C. Marshall. The French forces next to them consisted of 31 divisions, including the Fourth Army (under Henri Gouraud) and the Fifth Army (under Henri Mathias Berthelot). The U.S. divisions of the AEF were oversized (12 battalions per division versus the French-British-German nine battalions per division), being up to twice the size of other Allies' battle-depleted divisions upon arrival, but the French and other Allied divisions had been partly replenished prior to the Grand Offensive, so both the U.S. and French contributions in troops were considerable. All of the heavy equipment (tanks, artillery, and aircraft) was provided by the Allies (mainly by the French Army). For the Meuse–Argonne front alone, this represented 2,780 artillery pieces, 380 tanks, and 840 planes.

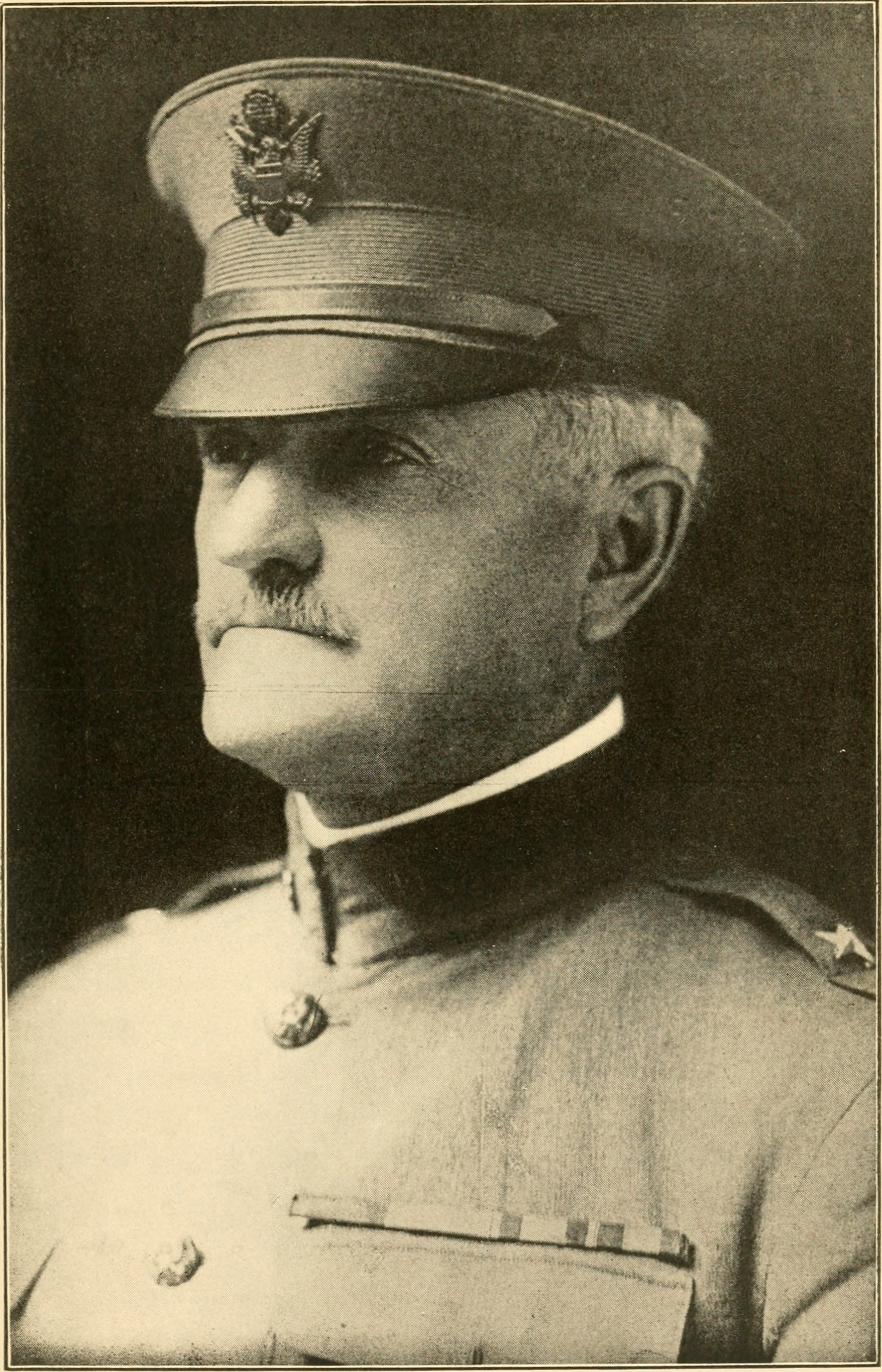
General John J. Pershing, Commander-in-Chief of the American Expeditionary Forces (AEF).

For armored support, the 35th Division was completed by the 1st Tank Brigade (under George S. Patton) with 127 American-crewed Renault FT light tank and 28 French-crewed Schneider medium tanks. The 3rd US Tank brigade with 250 French-crewed tank was also involved supporting the V Corps. The 37th and 79th Division were augmented with a French tank regiment (Renault FT light tank) and 2 groups of medium tank (St-Chamond). The 91st Division was augmented with an equivalent force (1 light tank regiment and 2 groups medium tank).

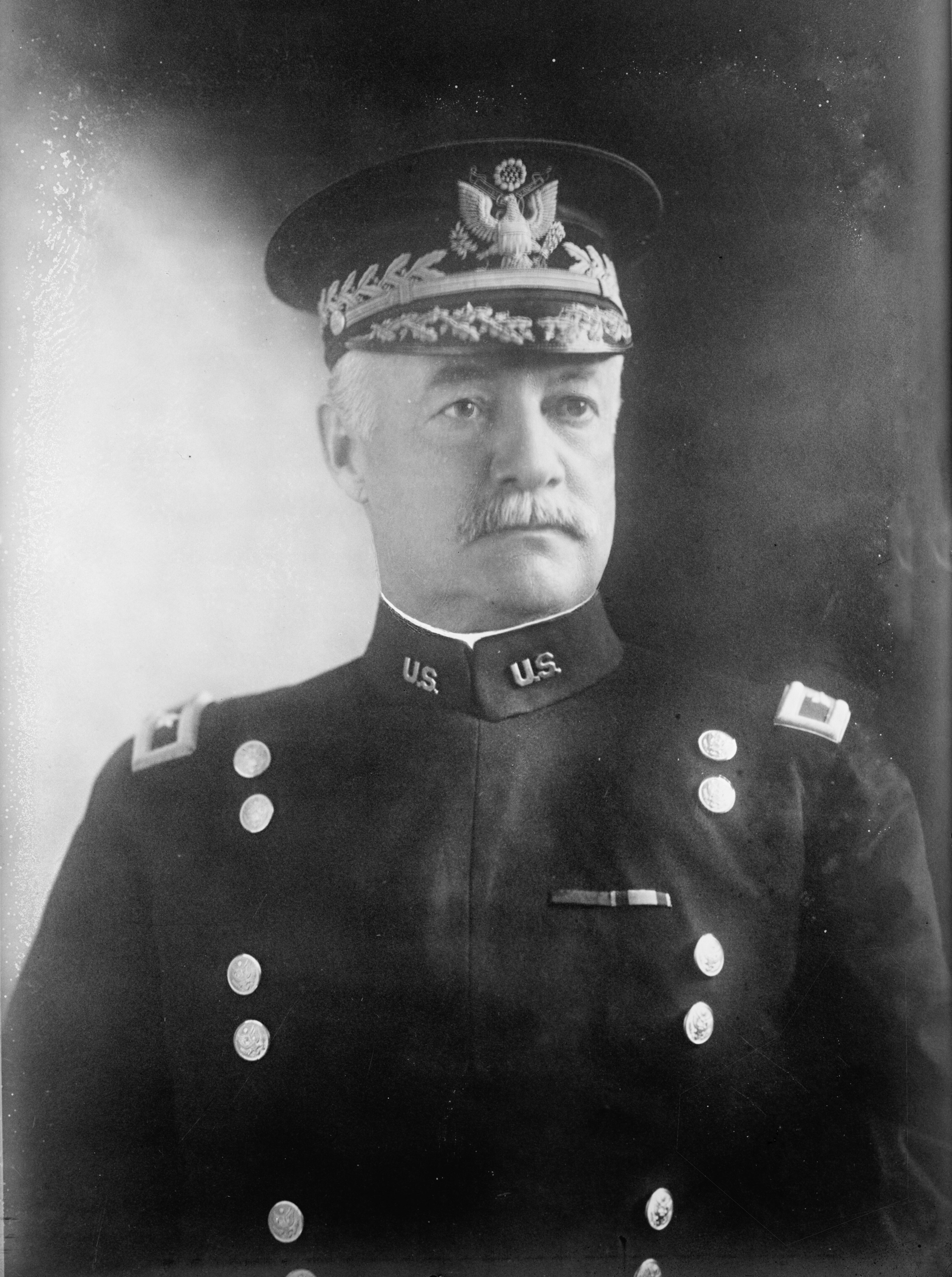
Lieutenant General Hunter Liggett, commanding the U.S. First Army.

As the battle progressed, both the Americans and the French brought in reinforcements. Eventually, 22 American divisions participated in the battle at one time or another, representing two full field armies. Other French forces involved included the 2nd Colonial Corps, under Henri Claudel, which had also fought alongside the AEF at the Battle of Saint-Mihiel earlier in September 1918.

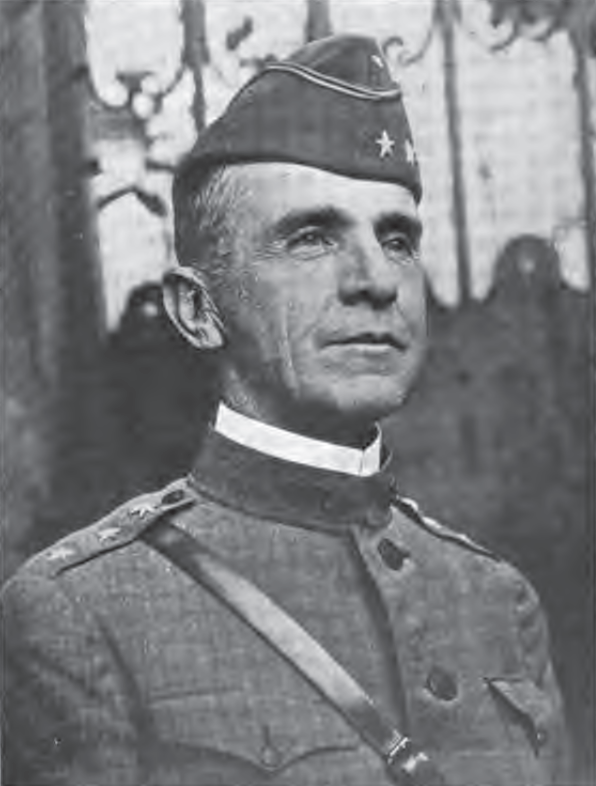
Lieutenant General Robert Lee Bullard, commanding the U.S. Second Army.

The opposing forces were wholly German. During this period of the war, German divisions procured only 50 percent or less of their initial strength. The 117th Division, which opposed the U.S. 79th Division during the offensive's first phase, had only 3,300 men in its ranks. Morale varied among German units. For example, divisions that served on the Eastern front had high morale, while conversely divisions that had been on the Western front had poor morale. Resistance grew to approximately 200,000–450,000 German troops from the Fifth Army of Group Gallwitz commanded by General Georg von der Marwitz. The Americans estimated that they opposed parts of 44 German divisions overall, though many fewer at any one time.

=== Objectives ===
- Pierce the Hindenburg Line: The primary objective of the Allied forces, particularly the AEF under the command of General John J. Pershing, was to breach the heavily fortified Hindenburg Line and advance beyond it. The Hindenburg Line was a series of heavily fortified defensive positions, including trenches, barbed wire entanglements, machine-gun nests, and artillery emplacements, designed to halt any Allied offensive.
- Advance into German Territory: By breaking through the Hindenburg Line, the Allies aimed to penetrate deep into German-held territory, disrupt enemy communication and supply lines, and weaken the German Army's ability to resist further Allied advances. This would also put pressure on Germany's ability to sustain the war effort, potentially hastening the end of the conflict.
- Force Germany to Surrender: The ultimate objective of the Battle of the Argonne Forest, as part of the broader Allied offensive on the Western Front, was to bring about the collapse of the German Army and compel Germany to seek an armistice and end the war. The success of the offensive was critical for achieving this goal and bringing about a decisive victory for the Allies.

== Battle ==
=== First phase (September 26 – October 4, 1918) ===
U.S. Army infantrymen advancing on German positions.

The Allies decided to prepare for the assault on September 26 at 02:30 by launching one of the most expensive and stunning artillery barrages. This barrage was done with 2711 artillery guns and helped to destroy obstacles like barbed wire to help the Allies push up more effectively when the assault began. One of these artillery groups was led by Capt. Harry S. Truman, a future US president. According to a biography of George S. Patton, "during the three hours preceding H hour, the Allies expended more ammunition than both sides managed to fire throughout the four years of the Civil War. The cost was later calculated to have been $180 million, or $1 million per minute" (about $3.5 billion in 2022 dollars). The American attack began at 05:30 on September 26 with mixed results. The V and III Corps met most of their objectives, but the 79th Division failed to capture Montfaucon, the 28th "Keystone" Division's attack virtually ground to a halt due to formidable German resistance, and the 91st "Wild West" Division was compelled to evacuate the village of Épinonville though it advanced 8 km (5.0 mi). The inexperienced 37th "Buckeye" Division failed to capture Montfaucon d'Argonne.

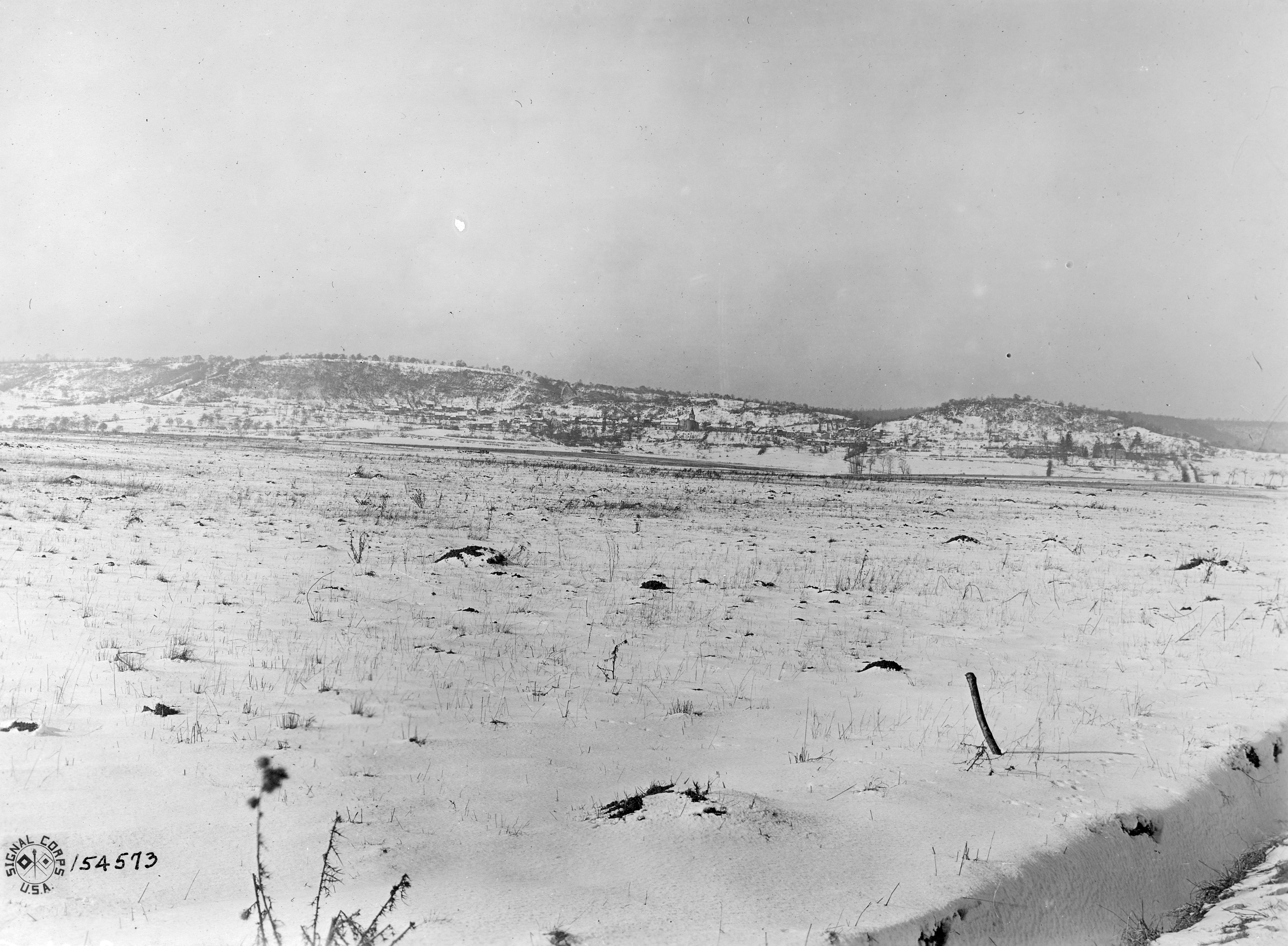
Hill 223

The next day, September 27, most of the 1st Army failed to make any gains. The 79th Division finally captured Montfaucon and the 35th "Santa Fe" Division captured the village of Baulny, Hill 218, and Charpentry, placing the division forward of adjacent units. On September 29, six extra German divisions were deployed to oppose the American attack, with the 5th Guards and 52nd Division counterattacking the 35th Division, which had run out of food and ammunition during the attack. The Germans initially made significant gains, but were barely repulsed by the 35th Division's 110th Engineers, 128th Machine Gun Battalion, and Harry Truman's Battery D, 129th Field Artillery. In the words of Pershing, "We were no longer engaged in a maneuver for the pinching out of a salient, but were necessarily committed, generally speaking, to a direct frontal attack against strong, hostile positions fully manned by a determined enemy."

The German counterattack had shattered so much of the 35th Division—made up of National Guard units from Missouri and Kansas, most of whose key leaders had been replaced shortly before the attack—that it had to be relieved early, though remnants of the division subsequently reentered the battle. Part of the adjacent French attack met temporary confusion when one of its generals died. Nevertheless, it was able to advance 15 km (9 mi), penetrating deeply into the German lines, especially around Somme-Py (the Battle of Somme-Py (French: Bataille de Somme-Py)) and northwest of Reims (the Battle of Saint-Thierry (French: Bataille de Saint-Thierry)). The initial progress of the French forces was thus faster than the 3 to 8 km (2 to 5 mi) gained by the adjacent American units, though the French units were fighting in a more open terrain, which can be an easier terrain from which to attack.

With the US struggling to make the progress they wanted, as well as struggling to pull their logistics together, Pershing ordered a halt to the attack on October 1. This allowed Pershing to regroup all the men and reinforce the line. This move to halt the attack was not popular among the Allied Generals and almost lost Pershing his job. Despite the lack of faith in Pershing he was allowed to continue leading the offensive, and The Offensive started up again on October 4.

=== Second phase (October 4–28, 1918) ===
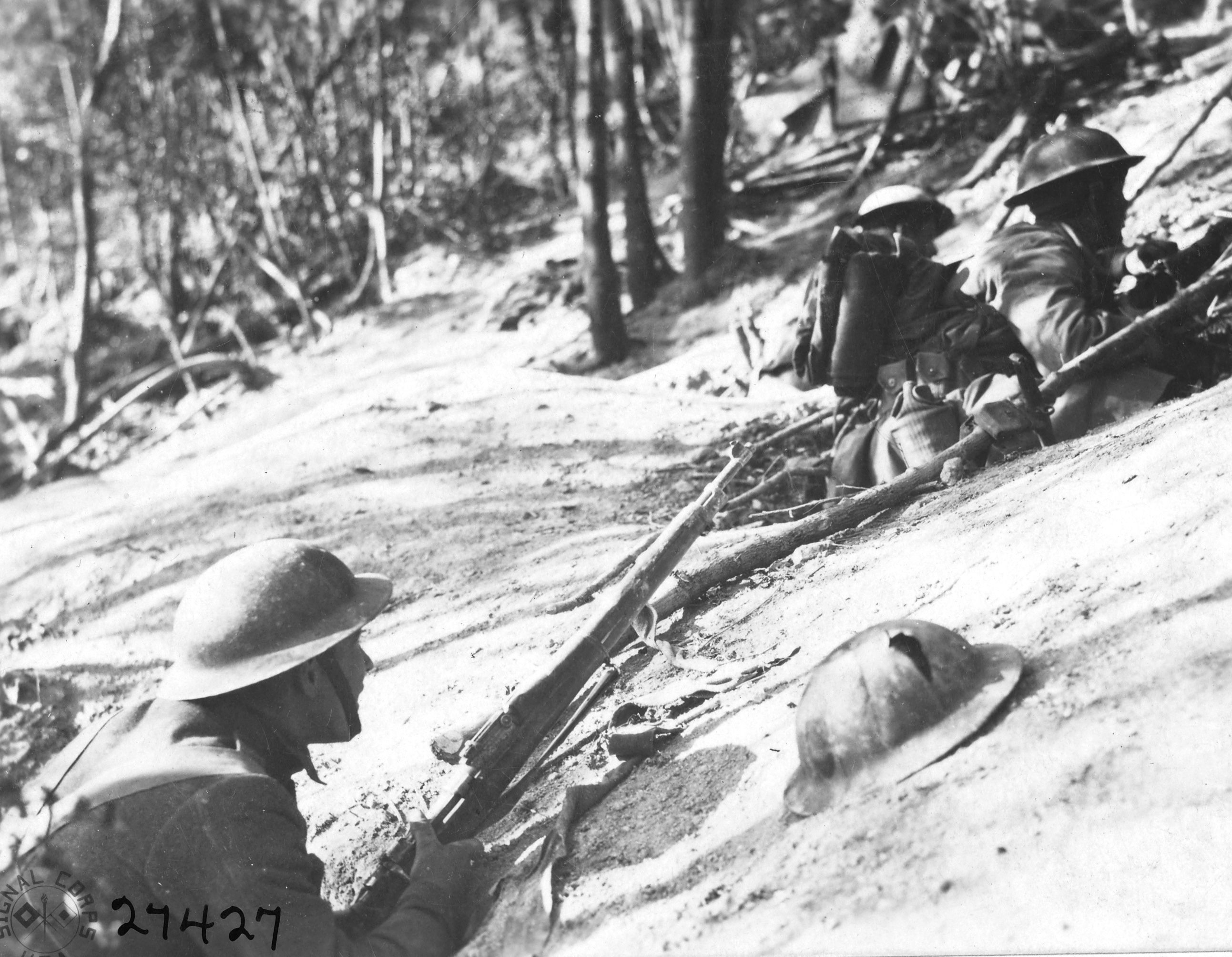
American soldiers of the 18th Infantry, 1st Division, holed in on the side of Hill 240, near Exermont, France, October 1918.

The second phase began on October 4, when the first assault divisions (the 91st, 79th, 37th and 35th) were replaced by the 32nd, 3rd and 1st Divisions. The 1st Division created a gap in the lines when it advanced 2.5 km (1.6 mi) against the 37th, 52nd, and 5th Guards Divisions. It was during this phase that the Lost Battalion affair occurred. The battalion was rescued by an attack by the 28th and 82nd Divisions (the 82nd attacking soon after taking up its positions in the gap between the 28th and 1st Divisions) on October 7. On October 12 Pershing had to reorganize the AEF and First Army due to the many struggles that were occurring in the second phase including disasters like the lost battalion which reflected badly on Pershing's leadership. Pershing started by dividing the First Army into two smaller armies. The First Army would be led by Hunter Ligget, and the newly formed Second Army would be led by Robert Bullard. Pershing, now free to focus on just the AEF, cleaned out all of the AEF's senior officers. This was done as Pershing felt the AEF leaders lacked the aggression that was needed in the offensive. The Americans launched a series of costly frontal assaults that finally broke through the main German defenses (the Krimhilde Stellung of the Hindenburg Line) between October 14–17 (the Battle of Montfaucon (French: Bataille de Montfaucon)). During the Battle of Montfaucon Missouri and Kansas National Guard soldiers were the first U.S. troops who tried to break through the stronghold of the Hindenburg Line at Côte de Châtillon but they were repulsed due to poor leadership. Next, the elite U.S. 1st Infantry Division tried and failed after suffering catastrophic casualties. The Rainbow Division (42nd Division) under Brigadier General Douglas MacArthur was finally able to take Côte de Châtillon after exposing a gap in the German defenses that was discovered by MacArthur's soldiers. This victory at Côte de Châtillon was considered the decisive turning point of the whole Meuse–Argonne offensive.

By the end of October, U.S. troops had advanced ten miles and cleared the Argonne Forest. On their left the French had advanced twenty miles, reaching the Aisne River. It was during the opening of this operation, on October 8, that Corporal (later Sergeant) Alvin York made his famous capture of 132 German prisoners near Cornay. On October 23, notable injuries were sustained by Major Frank Cavanaugh as a result of enemy shellfire. From October 27 to November 1, Liggett allowed the Army to reorganize. This was due to the huge number of casualties that the First Army had taken, with over 9000 men lost since the start of the operation. The First Army needed time to not only train the fresh troops coming in, but also needed time for First Army engineers to build roads and light rails. Liggett wanted to ensure that he had manpower and resources, since the advantage they held over the Germans was the ability to reinforce and outnumber.

=== Third phase (October 28 – November 11, 1918) ===
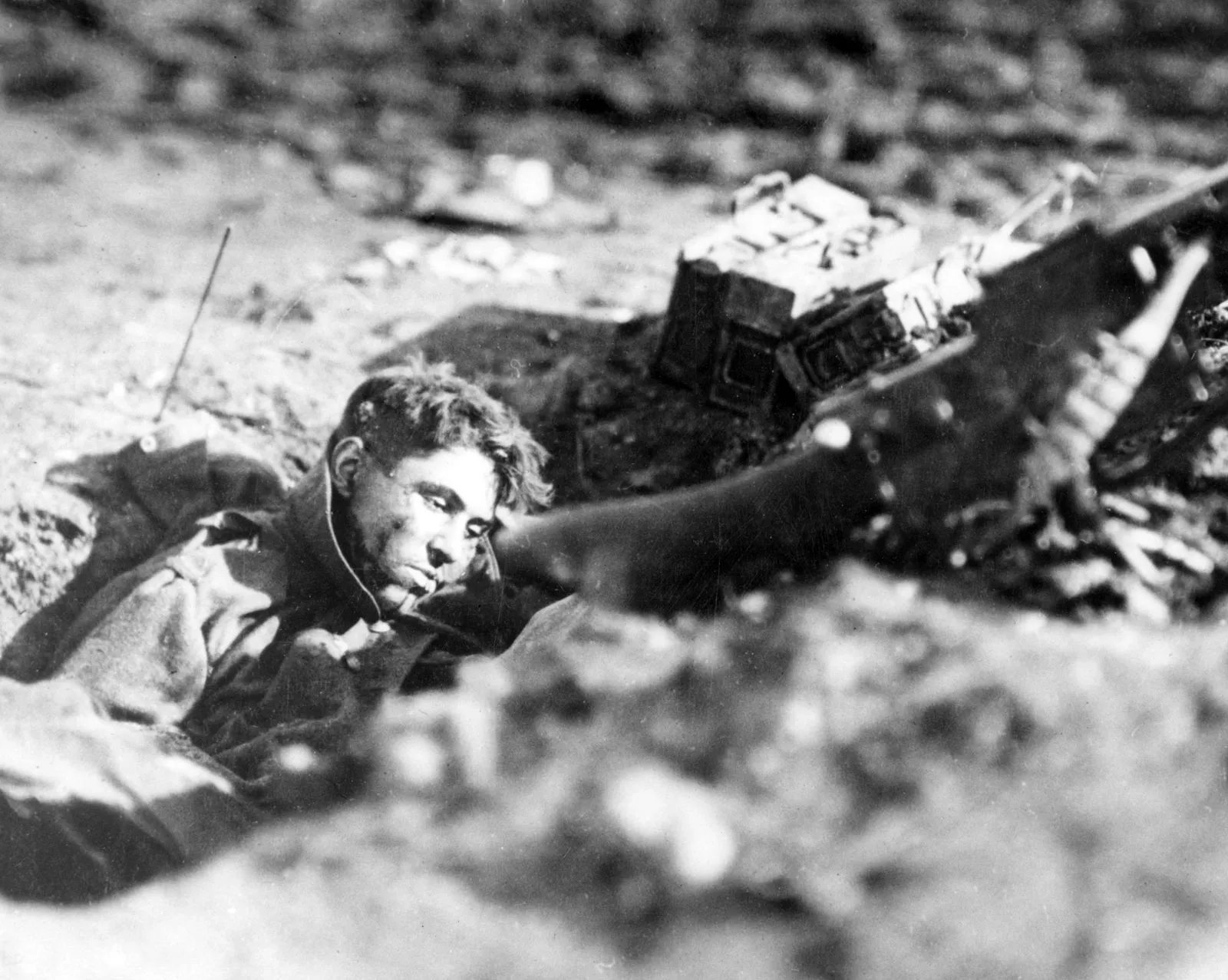
Dead German machine gunner at Villers-devant-Dun, France, November 4, 1918.

By October 31, the Americans had advanced 15 km (9.3 mi) and had cleared the Argonne Forest. On their left the French had advanced 30 km (19 mi), reaching the River Aisne. The American forces reorganized into two armies. The First, led by General Liggett, moved to the Carignan-Sedan-Mezieres Railroad. The Second Army, led by Lieutenant General Robert L. Bullard, was directed to move eastward toward Metz. The two U.S. armies faced portions of 31 German divisions during this phase. The American troops captured German defenses at Buzancy, allowing French troops to cross the River Aisne, whence they rushed forward, capturing Le Chesne (the Battle of Chesne (French: Bataille du Chesne)). In the final days, the French forces conquered the immediate objective, Sedan and its critical railroad hub (the Advance to the Meuse (French: Poussée vers la Meuse)), on November 6 and American forces captured surrounding hills. On November 11, news of the German armistice put a sudden end to the fighting. Over the three phases of the offensive, the Americans had advanced 34 miles. ‌

== Gallery ==
Gallery

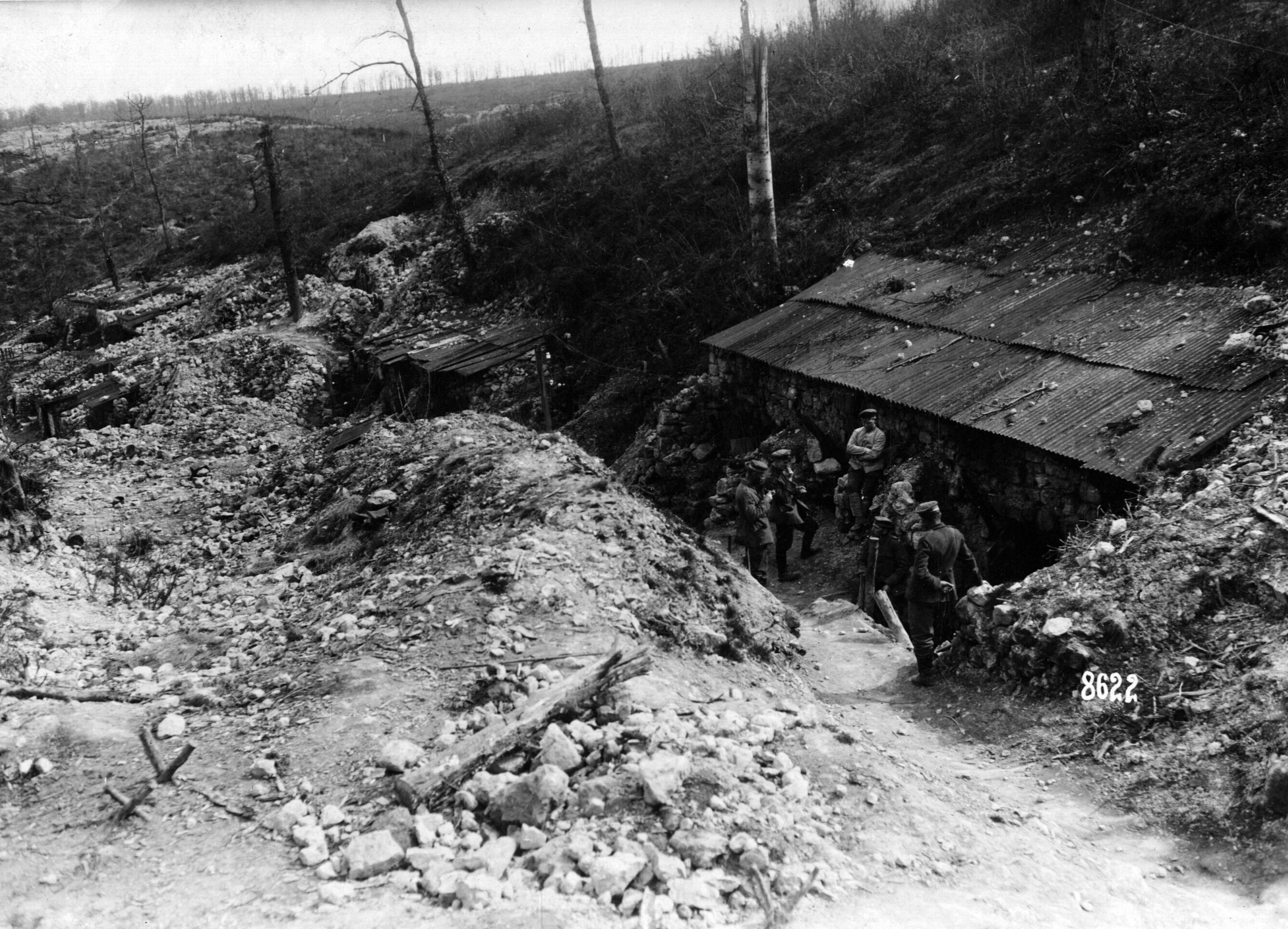
German dugouts in the Argonnes

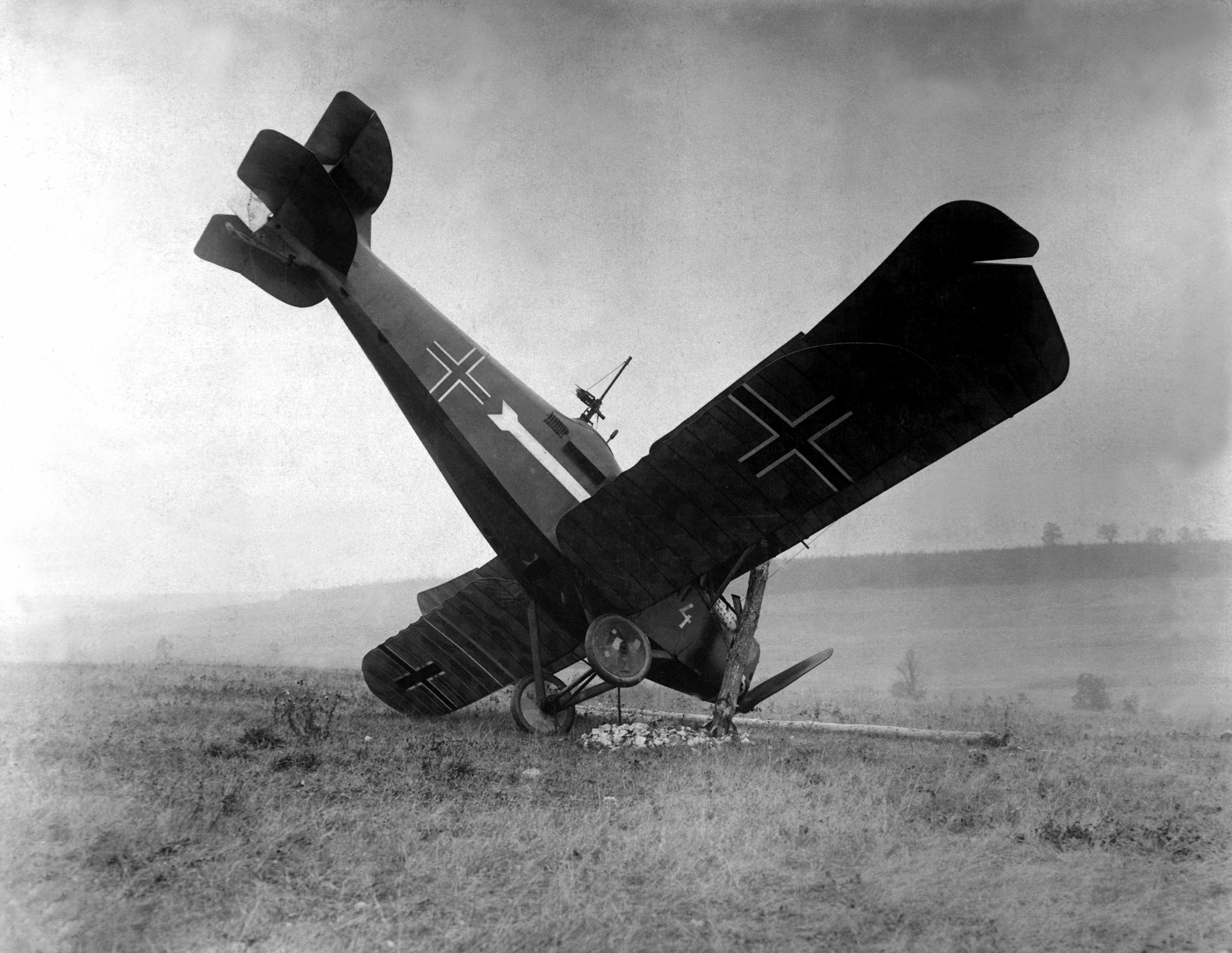
German Hannover biplane forced down near Cierges

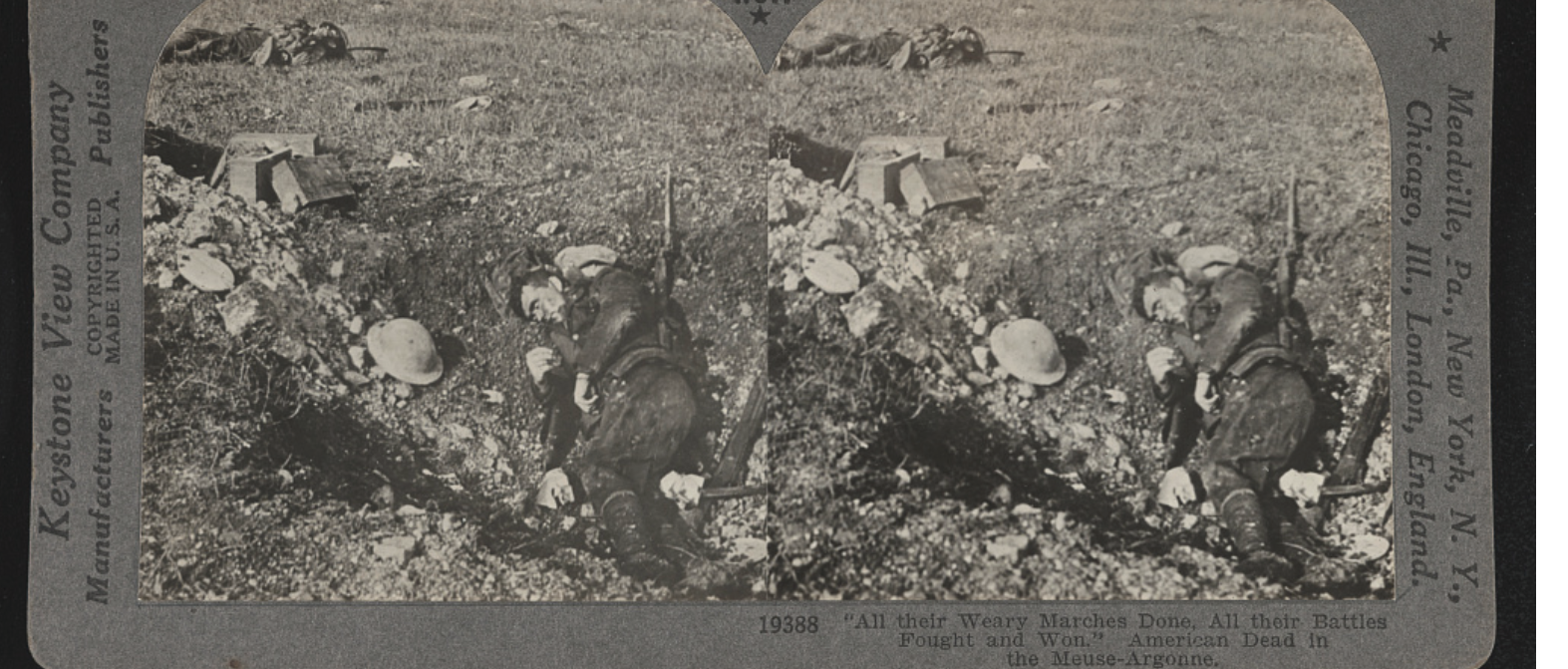
Stereoscopic image of Americans killed in the offensive

The 369th American Infantry Regiment during the offensive.

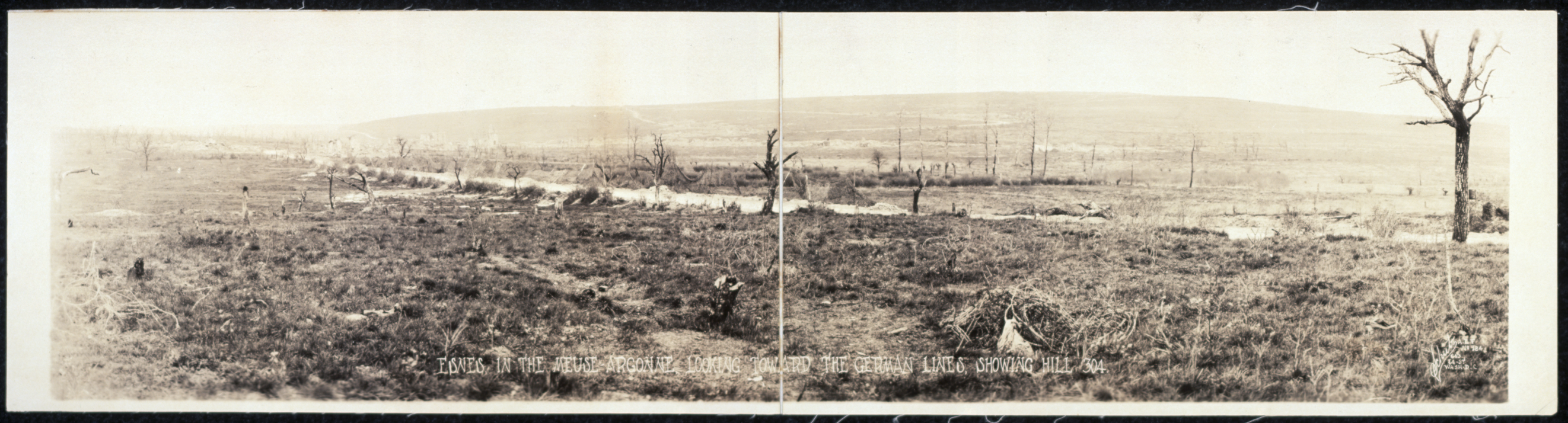
Panorama of no man's land, looking towards the German lines circa 1919

== See also ==
- List of military engagements of World War I
- Meuse-Argonne American Cemetery
- Meuse-Argonne American Memorial
