= 5th Army (German Empire) =

Army level command of the German Army in World War I

5. Armee; 5th Army
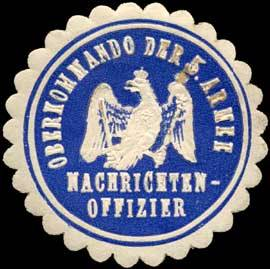
- Seal mark of the High Command of the 5th Army - News Officer
- Active: 2 August 1914 – 30 January 1919
- Country: German Empire
- Branch: Imperial German Army
- Type: Field army
- Engagements: World War I: Western Front

Commanders
- Notable commanders: Crown Prince Wilhelm

Insignia
- Abbreviation: A.O.K. 5

The 5th Army (German: 5. Armee / Armeeoberkommando 5 / A.O.K. 5) was a field army of the Imperial German Army during World War I. It was formed on mobilization in August 1914 seemingly from the VII Army Inspection. The army was disbanded in 1919 during demobilization after the war.

== History ==
In August 1914 the command of 5th Army was assigned to Crown Prince Wilhelm of Germany, heir to the Hohenzollern throne, with General Schmidt von Knobelsdorf serving as his chief of staff, and would remain thus until late 1916. The opening hostilities on the Western Front saw the Crown Prince's 5th Army, along with the neighboring 4th Army (commanded by Albrecht, Duke of Württemberg), acting at the center of the Schlieffen plan attack into Belgium and France. On 21 August 1914, in what became known as the Battle of the Ardennes, the 4th and 5th Armies advanced into the Ardennes to counter a thrust by the French 3rd and 4th Armies. Over the next two days 5th Army played a major part in halting the opposing French forces. By 23 August, after taking heavy losses and being outmaneuvered strategically, the two French armies were driven into retreat. Following the German 5th Army's victory in the Battle of the Ardennes it moved to Verdun, where it would remain until 1918. In February 1916 the Crown Prince's 5th Army would launch Operation Gericht, the German offensive that began the Battle of Verdun, one of the bloodiest and longest battles in history. Late in 1916, after suffering terrible losses in its efforts at Verdun, General Max von Gallwitz assumed control of 5th Army. Before the close of the war 5th Army fought in several noteworthy actions, including the Battle of Saint-Mihiel, in September 1918, when it was defeated by the American Expeditionary Force under John J. Pershing. The Fifth Army continued to oppose the AEF's Meuse-Argonne Offensive until the Armistice of 11 November 1918. At the end of the war it was serving as part of Heeresgruppe Gallwitz.

=== Order of Battle, 30 October 1918 ===
By the end of the war, the 5th Army was organised as:

Organization of 5th Army on 30 October 1918
Army	Corps	Division
5th Army	58th Corps (z.b.V.)	240th Division
5th Army	58th Corps (z.b.V.)	15th Bavarian Division
5th Army	58th Corps (z.b.V.)	52nd Division
5th Army	58th Corps (z.b.V.)	31st Division
5th Army	XXI Corps	13th Division
5th Army	XXI Corps	28th Division
5th Army	XXI Corps	107th Division
5th Army	XXI Corps	5th Bavarian Reserve Division
5th Army	XXI Corps	88th Division
5th Army	XXI Corps	115th Division
5th Army	V Reserve Corps	123rd Division
5th Army	V Reserve Corps	1st Division (Austria-Hungary)
5th Army	V Reserve Corps	part of 106th Division (Austria-Hungary)
5th Army	V Reserve Corps	228th Division
5th Army	V Reserve Corps	192nd Division
5th Army	V Reserve Corps	41st Division
5th Army	V Reserve Corps	27th Division
5th Army	V Reserve Corps	117th Division
5th Army	IX Reserve Corps	1st Landwehr Division
5th Army	IX Reserve Corps	15th Division
5th Army	XVIII Corps (Austria-Hungary)	33rd Division
5th Army	XVIII Corps (Austria-Hungary)	32nd Division
5th Army	XVIII Corps (Austria-Hungary)	106th Division (Austria-Hungary) (less elements)
5th Army	XVIII Corps (Austria-Hungary)	37th Division
5th Army	XVIII Corps (Austria-Hungary)	236th Division
5th Army	XVIII Corps (Austria-Hungary)	20th Division
5th Army	Moving to Armee-Abteilung C	45th Reserve Division

== Commanders ==
The 5th Army had the following commanders during its existence:

5th Army
From	Commander	Previously	Subsequently
2 August 1914	Generalmajor Wilhelm, Crown Prince of Germany		Heeresgruppe Deutscher Kronprinz
27 January 1915	Generalleutnant Wilhelm, Crown Prince of Germany		Heeresgruppe Deutscher Kronprinz
30 November 1916	General der Infanterie Ewald von Lochow	Maas Group East	Placed on active reserve status
17 December 1916	General der Artillerie Max von Gallwitz	2nd Army	Heeresgruppe Gallwitz concurrently from 1 February 1918
27 September 1918	General der Kavallerie Georg von der Marwitz	2nd Army	Retired

== Glossary ==
- Armee-Abteilung or Army Detachment in the sense of "something detached from an Army". It is not under the command of an Army so is in itself a small Army.
- Armee-Gruppe or Army Group in the sense of a group within an Army and under its command, generally formed as a temporary measure for a specific task.
- Heeresgruppe or Army Group in the sense of a number of armies under a single commander.

== See also ==
- 5th Army (Wehrmacht) for the equivalent formation in World War II
- German Army order of battle (1914)
- German Army order of battle, Western Front (1918)
- Schlieffen Plan

== Bibliography ==
- Cron, Hermann (2002). Imperial German Army 1914–18: Organisation, Structure, Orders-of-Battle [first published: 1937]. Helion & Co. ISBN 1-874622-70-1.
- Ellis, John; Cox, Michael (1993). The World War I Databook. Aurum Press Ltd. ISBN 1-85410-766-6.
