= Max von Fabeck =

- Born: 6 May 1854; Berlin, Kingdom of Prussia
- Died: 16 December 1916 (aged 62); Partenkirchen, Kingdom of Bavaria, German Empire
- Military career
- Allegiance: Prussia; German Empire
- Branch: Imperial German Army
- Service years: 1871–1916
- Rank: General der Infanterie
- Commands: 78th Infantry Regiment (Osnabrück); 25th Infantry Brigade (Münster); 28th Division (Karlsruhe); XV Corps (Straßburg); XIII Corps (Stuttgart); 11th Army; 1st Army; 12th Army; 8th Army
- Conflicts: World War I: First Battle of Ypres (1914); Battle of Mons (1914); Battle of Le Cateau (1914); First Battle of the Marne (1914); Battle of the Ourcq
- Awards: Pour le Mérite

Herrmann Gustav Karl Max von Fabeck (6 May 1854 – 16 December 1916) was a Prussian military officer and a German General der Infanterie during World War I. He commanded the 13th Corps in the 5th Army and took part in the Race to the Sea on the Western Front and also commanded the new 11th Army on the Eastern Front. Subsequently, he commanded several German armies during the war until his evacuation from the front due to illness in 1916 and died on 16 December. A competent and highly decorated commander, von Fabeck is a recipient of the Pour le Mérite, Prussia's and Germany's highest military honor.

== Life ==
Fabeck was born in Berlin in 1854, when it was the capital of the Kingdom of Prussia. He was the son of Prussian Lieutenant-General Hermann von Fabeck (1816–1873) and wife Bertha, née von dem Borne (1829–1910). By the time he was 17 years old he was already a second lieutenant in the 1st Footguards Regiment (German: 1. Garde-Regiment zu Fuß). From 1878 to 1879 he attended the Prussian Military Academy. In 1882 he was appointed to the German General Staff and was promoted to captain in 1884. From 1886 he served in the General Staff of the 28. Division in Karlsruhe.

On 24 October 1887 married Helene von Seldeneck (7 October 1863 in Karlsruhe – 13 July 1938 in Cologne), the daughter of William and Julie (nee Brandt Von Lindau) von Seldeneck, chamberlain of the Grand Duke of Baden. The couple had four daughters Ilse, Maria, Margaret, and Hildegard.

He became a staff officer to the VI Army Corps in Breslau in 1889 and shortly thereafter was promoted to major. From 1893 he served in the regiment Grenadier König Friedrich Wilhelm II. (1. Schlesisches ) Nr. 10 in Schweidnitz. In 1896 he was a Lieutenant Colonel Chief of Staff of the XI. Army Corps in Kassel. In 1898 he was promoted to colonel and received his first command: the Infanterie-Regiments „Herzog Friedrich Wilhelm von Braunschweig“ (Ostfriesisches) Nr. 78 in Osnabrück. From 1901 he led the 25th Infantry Brigade in the 13th Army Division in Münster. He was promoted to major general that same year.

In 1906 Fabeck was promoted to lieutenant general and commander of the 28th Army Division in Karlsruhe. In 1910 he was appointed general of the infantry and commanding general of the XV Army Corps in Strasbourg. In 1913 he assumed the same position at the XIII (Royal Württemberg) Army Corps in Stuttgart. He met Fritz von Loßberg as the chief of staff. Loßberg helped Fabeck to have a united staff officers before the war.

== World War I ==
At the beginning of World War, the XIII Army Corps commanded by von Fabeck was part of Germany's 5th Army which was commanded by Crown Prince Wilhelm. It participated in the mobile battles known as the Race to the Sea. During the First Battle of Ypres, Fabeck made his move with newly formed 5 divisions with backups of heavy reserve artillery. It was job of I Corps to fight back them. In March 1915 von Fabeck briefly commanded the newly formed 11th Army, which was quickly transferred from the Western to the Eastern fronts with whom he fought in Lithuania. In April 1915 he replaced the injured Alexander von Kluck as commander of the 1st Army. In September 1915 von Fabeck got command of the 12th Army, with whom he transferred to the Eastern Front. He was also attached à la suite to Infanterie-Regiment Nr. 129 on 27 January 1916. Before he fell ill in October 1916 von Fabeck was the commander of 8th Army for a few weeks.

General von Fabeck was awarded the Pour le Mérite for outstanding military leadership during the 1914–15 campaigns in Flanders and northern France, as well as in recognition of successful operational planning in the battles at Mons, Le Cateau and the Ourcq river. He received a personal telegram from the Wilhelm II congratulating him on the award.

== Death ==
In October 1916 von Fabeck became seriously ill and he committed suicide on 16 December 1916 at Partenkirchen, Kingdom of Bavaria.

== Awards ==
- Grand Cross of the Order of the Crown of Württemberg
- Grand Cross of the Order of the Zähringer Lion
- Bavarian Military Merit Order
- Grand Cross of the Order of Philip the Magnanimous
- Grand Cross of the Order of Red Eagle with Oak Leaves
- Order of the Crown of Prussia, 1st class
- Prussian Service Award Cross
- Grand Cross of the Albert Order with Gold Star
- Commander of the Order of the Crown of Italy
- Grand Cross of the Order of the Crown of Romania
- Iron Cross (1914), 1st and 2nd class
- Commander of the Military Merit Order of Württemberg on 1 November 1914
- Pour le Mérite 23 August 1915

== Dates of ranks ==
- Fähnrich—1 October 1871
- Leutnant—18 October 1871
- Oberleutnant—18 October 1879
- Hauptmann—12 July 1884
- Major—19 November 1889
- Oberstleutnant—27 January 1896
- Oberst—24 May 1898
- Generalmajor—14 November 1901
- Generalleutnant—27 January 1906
- General der Infanterie—13 January 1910

== Literature ==
- Holger Afflerbach: Kaiser Wilhelm II. als oberster Kriegsherr im Ersten Weltkrieg. Quellen aus der militärischen Umgebung des Kaisers 1914–1918 Deutsche Geschichtsquellen des 19. und 20. Jahrhunderts, Band 64. (München: Oldenbourg, 2005) ISBN 3-486-57581-3
- Ian F. W. Beckett: Ypres. The First Battle, 1914. (Harlow: Pearson/Education, 2004) ISBN 0-582-50612-3
- Robert T. Foley: German Strategy and the Path to Verdun. Erich Falkenhayn and the development of Attrition 1870–1916 (Cambridge University Press, 2005) ISBN 0-521-84193-3

Military offices
Preceded by General der Infanterie Leopold Hentschel von Gilgenheimb	Commander, XV Corps; 31 January 1910 – 1 March 1913	Succeeded by General der Infanterie Berthold von Deimling
Preceded by General der Kavallerie Albrecht, Duke of Württemberg	Commander, XIII (Royal Württemberg) Corps; 1 March 1913 – 9 March 1915	Succeeded by General der Infanterie Theodor von Watter
Preceded by New Formation	Commander, 11th Army; 9–27 March 1915	Succeeded by Generalfeldmarschall August von Mackensen
Preceded by Generaloberst Alexander von Kluck	Commander, 1st Army; 28 March – 17 September 1915	Succeeded by Dissolved
Preceded by General der Artillerie Max von Gallwitz	Commander, 12th Army; 22 September 1915 – 4 October 1916	Succeeded by Dissolved
Preceded by General der Infanterie Otto von Below	Commander, 8th Army; 5–22 October 1916	Succeeded by General der Infanterie Bruno von Mudra
