= Hermann von Eichhorn =

German general (1848–1918)

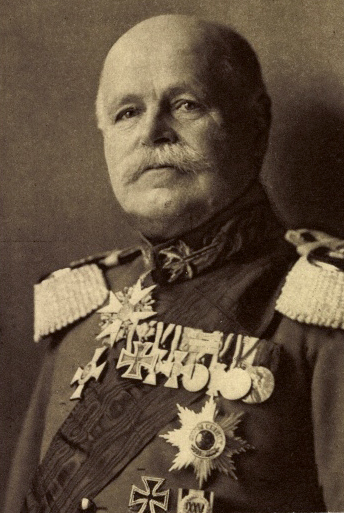
- Eichhorn in 1910
- Born: 13 February 1848; Breslau, Kingdom of Prussia, German Confederation (now Wrocław, Poland)
- Died: 30 July 1918 (aged 70); Kiev, Ukrainian State
- Cause of death: Assassination by bomb
- Military career
- Allegiance: Kingdom of Prussia; German Empire
- Branch: Prussian Army; Imperial German Army
- Service years: 1866–1918
- Rank: Generalfeldmarshall (Field Marshal)
- Commands: 8th (1st Brandenburg) Life Grenadiers "King Frederick William III"; 18th Infantry Brigade; 9th Division; XVIII Corps; 10th Army; Heeresgruppe Eichhorn-Wilna; Heeresgruppe Eichhorn-Kiev
- Conflicts: Austro-Prussian War; Battle of Königgrätz; Franco-Prussian War; First World War; First Battle of Champagne; Second Battle of the Masurian Lakes; Great Retreat; Russian Civil War X
- Awards: Pour le Mérite with Oak Leaves

Hermann Emil Gottfried von Eichhorn (13 February 1848 – 30 July 1918) was a German officer, ending his career as a Generalfeldmarschall during World War I. He was a recipient of Pour le Mérite with Oak Leaves, one of the highest orders of merit in the Kingdom of Prussia and Imperial Germany. While serving as the military governor of Ukraine during the Russian Civil War, Eichhorn was assassinated by a Russian socialist.

== Biography ==
Eichhorn was born in Breslau in the Province of Silesia (now Wrocław in Poland). His father Karl Friedrich Hermann Eichhorn (1813–1892) was a politician, as were both of his grandfathers. He joined the Prussian Army in 1866, aged eighteen, and took part in the Austro-Prussian War of 1866, and in the Franco-Prussian War of 1870–1871. He won the Iron Cross second class during the Franco-Prussian War. He rose through the ranks of the Prussian Army, being appointed chief of the staff of the VI Army Corps at Breslau in 1897, commanding the 9th Division from 1901 to 1904 and the XVIII Army Corps from 1904 to 1912. In 1912, he took command of the 7th Army Inspection, the peacetime headquarters for the Imperial German XVI, XVIII, and XXI Army Corps.

At the outbreak of World War I in August 1914, Eichhorn was incapacitated because of an accident in May 1914, but he was able to play a part in the First Battle of Champagne, also known as the Battle of Soissons, at the beginning of 1915. He became the commanding general of the 10th Army on 21 January 1915, and commanded it until 5 March 1918. Under his command, the 10th Army engaged in the Second Battle of the Masurian Lakes in East Prussia in February 1915. In August 1915, he took Kovno and afterwards the fortresses of Grodno and Olita, and continued his advance into Russia. He received the Pour le Mérite on 18 August 1915 and the oak leaves to the Pour le Mérite on 28 September 1915. On 30 July 1916, while remaining in command of the 10th Army, Eichhorn became supreme commander of Army Group Eichhorn (Heeresgruppe Eichhorn) based around 10th Army, which he commanded until 31 March 1918. On 18 December 1917, Eichhorn was promoted to Generalfeldmarschall (field marshal). On 3 April 1918, he became supreme commander of Army Group Kiev (Heeresgruppe Kiew) and simultaneously military governor of Ukraine.

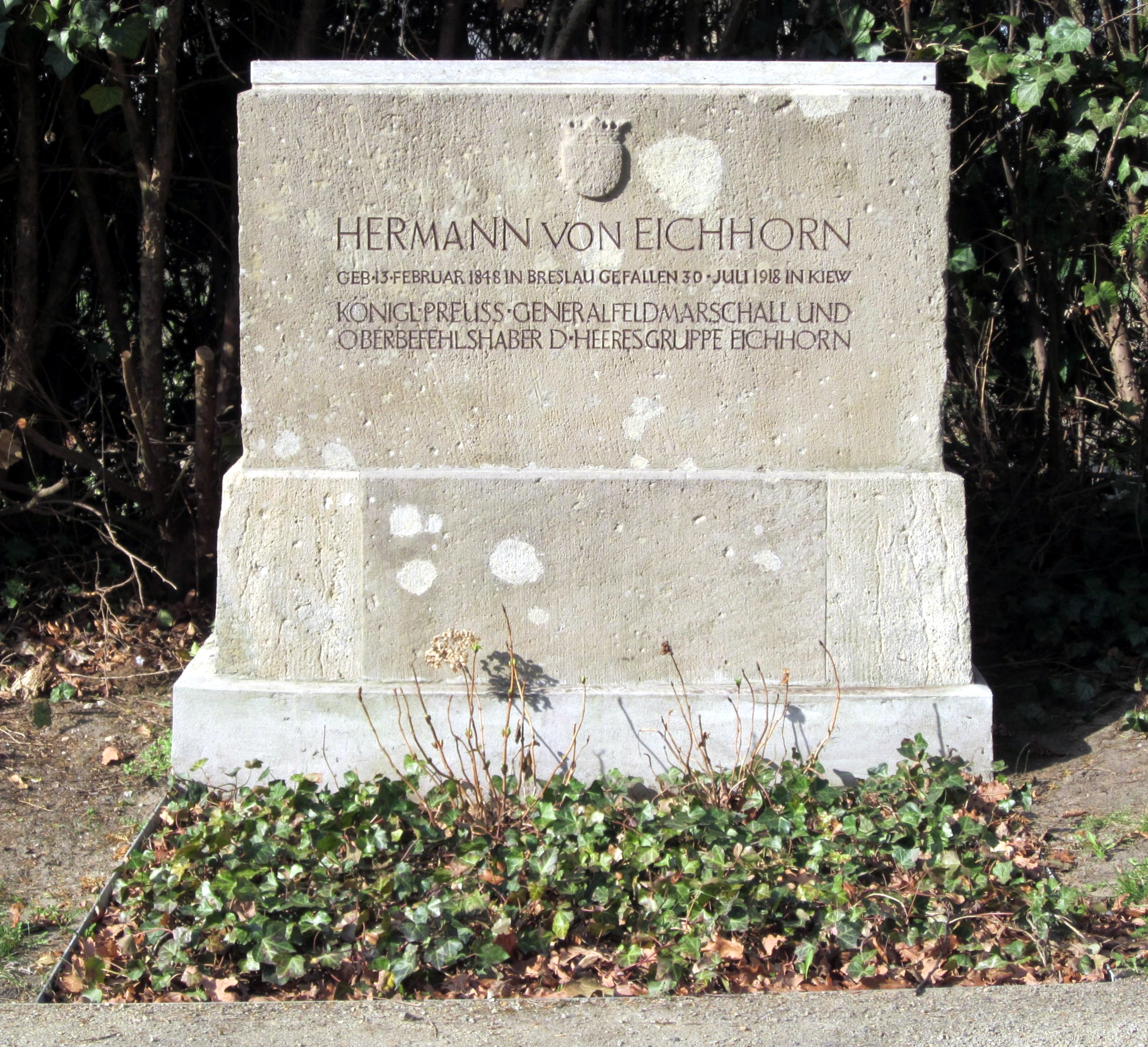
Grave of Hermann von Eichhorn (1918) in the Invalidenfriedhof, Berlin

== Death ==
Eichhorn was assassinated in Kiev by a member of the Russian Party of Left Socialist-Revolutionaries, Boris Donskoy, who threw a bomb at the carriage carrying Eichhorn. At that time, Pavlo Skoropadskyi was walking nearby and almost immediately came to the scene of the explosion and saw that the field marshal had no legs. Also killed was Eichhorn's adjutant, Walter von Dreßler. Donskoy was convicted of murder by a field military court and executed by hanging.

Eichhorn is buried in the Invalidenfriedhof in Berlin.

== Awards ==
- Iron Cross
  - 2nd Class (1871)
  - Oak Leaves (1895)
  - Clasp (1915)
  - 1st Class
- Order of Saint Stanislaus (Russian Empire), 3rd Class (31 August 1871)
- Prussian Order of the Crown, 1st Class (17 January 1904)
- Order of Philip the Magnanimous, Grand Cross with Crown (8 September 1905)
- Order of the Red Eagle, Grand Cross with Oak Leaves (20 August 1907)
- Ludwig Order, Grand Cross (15 September 1912)
- Pour le Mérite (18 August 1915), with Oak Leaves (28 September 1915)
- Military Order of St. Henry, Commander 2nd Class (25 October 1916)

Eichhorn was also awarded an honorary doctorate from the University of Berlin on 18 February 1918.

Wilhelm II, German Emperor, decreed that one of the eight towers of Marienburg Castle of the Teutonic Order (now Malbork Castle in Poland) should be named after Eichhorn. On 17 July 1909, Eichhornstraße in the Marzahn-Hellersdorf district of Berlin was named after him and as of 2026 still bears his name.

== Notes ==
=== Bibliography ===
- Skoropadskyi, Pavlo (2019). Воспоминания Гетмана [Hetman's memory]. ПРОЗАиК. ISBN 978-5-91631-282-9.

Military offices
New title	Commander, 10th Army; 26 January 1915 – 5 March 1918	Succeeded by General der Infanterie; Erich von Falkenhayn
