= Ewald von Lochow =

German general (1855–1942)

- Ewald von Lochow during WWI
- Born: 1 April 1855; Petkus, Kingdom of Prussia
- Died: 11 April 1942 (aged 87); Berlin-Charlottenburg, Nazi Germany
- Military career
- Allegiance: German Empire (to 1918)
- Branch: Army
- Service years: 1878–1917
- Rank: General der Infanterie
- Commands: 4th Foot Guards; 19th Infantry Brigade; 2nd Guards Infantry Division; III Corps; 5th Army
- Conflicts: World War I Battle of Mons First Battle of the Marne Battle of Verdun
- Awards: Pour le Mérite with Oakleaves

Ewald Constantin Ferdinand Friedrich von Lochow (1 April 1855 in Petkus – 11 April 1942 in Berlin-Charlottenburg) was a Prussian officer and later General of Infantry during World War I. He was a recipient of Pour le Mérite with Oakleaves.

== Awards ==
- Iron Cross II Class (1914)
- Iron Cross I Class (1914)
- Pour le Mérite (14 January 1915) and Oakleaves (13 November 1915)
- Order of the Crown
- Order of the Zähringer Lion
- Order of Albert the Bear
- Hanseatic Cross Lübeck
- Order of the Red Eagle
- Bavarian Military Merit Order
- Albert Order
- Württemberg Order of the Crown
- Friedrich Order

Military offices
Preceded by General der Infanterie Karl von Bülow	Commander, III Corps; 1 October 1912 – 25 November 1916	Succeeded by Generalleutnant Walther von Lüttwitz
Preceded by Generalleutnant Wilhelm, Crown Prince of Germany	Commander, 5th Army; 30 November – 17 December 1916	Succeeded by General der Artillerie Max von Gallwitz
