= 88th Infantry Division (German Empire) =

88th Infantry Division (88. Infanterie-Division)
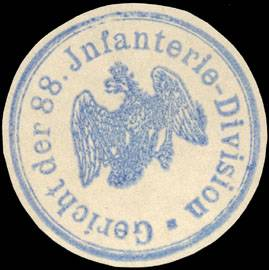
- Seal mark
- Active: November 1914 – 1919
- Country: German Empire
- Branch: Imperial German Army
- Type: Square division
- Role: Infantry
- Size: Approx. 12,500
- Nickname: Menges Division
- Engagements: World War I: Eastern Front; Battle of Łódź (1914); Gorlice-Tarnów Offensive; Western Front; German spring offensive; Operation Michael; Second Battle of the Marne; Meuse-Argonne Offensive

The 88th Infantry Division (88. Infanterie-Division) was a formation of the Imperial German Army in World War I. The division was formed in November 1914 as the Menges Division (Division Menges), named after its commander, and made up primarily of Landwehr troops. It became the 88th Infantry Division in August 1915. The division was disbanded in 1919 during the demobilization of the German Army after World War I.

== Combat chronicle ==
The Menges Division initially served on the Eastern Front, receiving its baptism of fire in the Battle of Łódź. In 1915, it participated in the Gorlice-Tarnów Offensive, breaking through at Przaznysz and fighting in the battle on the Narew. On August 2, 1915, it became the 88th Infantry Division. From November 1915 to December 1917, the division occupied the line near Daugavpils. In December 1917, after the armistice on the Eastern Front, the division was transferred to the Western Front, where it entered the line in positions near St. Quentin and on the Oise. It participated in the 1918 German spring offensive, fighting in Operation Michael, also known as the Battle of St. Quentin. From April to July 1918, it was in the line in the Champagne region, and then fought in the Second Battle of the Marne. Except for minor periods, it remained in the Champagne region until the end of the war, and faced the Allied Meuse-Argonne Offensive in October and November 1918. Allied intelligence rated the division as fourth class.

== Order of battle on formation ==
The 88th Infantry Division was formed as an overstrength square division, with three infantry brigades. The order of battle of the division on August 2, 1915, was as follows:

- 175. Landwehr-Infanterie-Brigade
  - Landwehr-Infanterie-Regiment Nr. 349
  - Landwehr-Infanterie-Regiment Nr. 350
- 176. Infanterie-Brigade
  - Infanterie-Regiment Nr. 351
  - Infanterie-Regiment Nr. 352
- 177. Infanterie-Brigade
  - Infanterie-Regiment Nr. 353
  - Infanterie-Regiment Nr. 354
- Kavallerie-Regiment Nr. 88
- Feldartillerie-Regiment Nr. 88
- Landwehr-Fußartillerie-Bataillon Nr. 6
- Landwehr-Pionier-Bataillon Nr. 6

== Late-war order of battle ==
The division underwent a number of organizational changes over the course of the war. It was triangularized in the summer of 1916. Cavalry was reduced, artillery and signals commands were formed, and combat engineer support was expanded to a full pioneer battalion. The order of battle on October 21, 1918, was as follows:

- 176. Infanterie-Brigade
  - Infanterie-Regiment Nr. 352
  - Infanterie-Regiment Nr. 353
  - Infanterie-Regiment Nr. 426
- 1. Eskadron/ Jäger-Regiment zu Pferde Nr. 10
- Artillerie-Kommandeur 59
  - Feldartillerie-Regiment Nr. 88
  - Fußartillerie-Bataillon Nr. 123
- Stab Pionier-Bataillon Nr. 88
  - 3. Reserve-Kompanie/ Pionier-Bataillon Nr. 33
  - Pionier-Kompanie Nr. 249
  - Minenwerfer-Kompanie Nr. 88
- Divisions-Nachrichten-Kommandeur 88
