= 10th Army (German Empire) =

10. Armee; 10th Army
- Flag of the Staff of an Armee Oberkommando (1871–1918)
- Active: 26 January 1915 – 6 January 1919
- Country: German Empire
- Type: Army
- Engagements: World War I: Second Battle of the Masurian Lakes; Lake Naroch Offensive

Insignia
- Abbreviation: A.O.K. 10

The 10th Army (German: 10. Armee / Armeeoberkommando 10 / A.O.K. 10) was an army level command of the German Army in World War I formed in January 1915 in Cologne. It served exclusively on the Eastern Front. It was dissolved on 6 January 1919.

== History ==
During World War I the 10th Army was stationed on the Eastern Front where it fought against Russia. It also took part in the occupation of Poland and Belorussia at the end of 1918 when the war ended.

The Tenth Army published the newspaper "Zeitung der 10. Armee" ("Newspaper of the 10th Army").

== Commanders ==
The 10th Army had the following commanders:

10th Army
From	Commander	Previously	Subsequently
26 January 1915	Generaloberst Hermann von Eichhorn	VII Army Inspectorate (VII. Armee-Inspektion)	Heeresgruppe Eichhorn concurrently from 30 July 1916
18 December 1917	Generalfeldmarschall Hermann von Eichhorn	VII Army Inspectorate (VII. Armee-Inspektion)	Heeresgruppe Eichhorn concurrently from 30 July 1916
5 March 1918	General der Infanterie Erich von Falkenhayn	Heeresgruppe F	Retired

== Glossary ==
- Armee-Abteilung or Army Detachment in the sense of "something detached from an Army". It is not under the command of an Army so is in itself a small Army.
- Armee-Gruppe or Army Group in the sense of a group within an Army and under its command, generally formed as a temporary measure for a specific task.
- Heeresgruppe or Army Group in the sense of a number of armies under a single commander.

== See also ==
- 10th Army (Wehrmacht) for the equivalent formation in World War II
- Great Retreat (Russian)
- Lake Naroch Offensive

== Bibliography ==
- Cron, Hermann (2002). Imperial German Army 1914–18: Organisation, Structure, Orders-of-Battle [first published: 1937]. Helion & Co. ISBN 1-874622-70-1.
- Ellis, John; Cox, Michael (1993). The World War I Databook. Aurum Press Ltd. ISBN 1-85410-766-6.
