= Unichowo =

- Village
- Location within Poland
- Coordinates: 54°17′27″N 17°26′47″E
- Country: Poland
- Voivodeship: Pomeranian
- County: Bytów
- Gmina: Czarna Dąbrówka
- Population: 322

Unichowo [uniˈxɔvɔ] (German: Wundichow) is a village in the administrative district of Gmina Czarna Dąbrówka, within Bytów County, Pomeranian Voivodeship, in northern Poland.
