= Georg von der Marwitz =

German general (1856–1929)

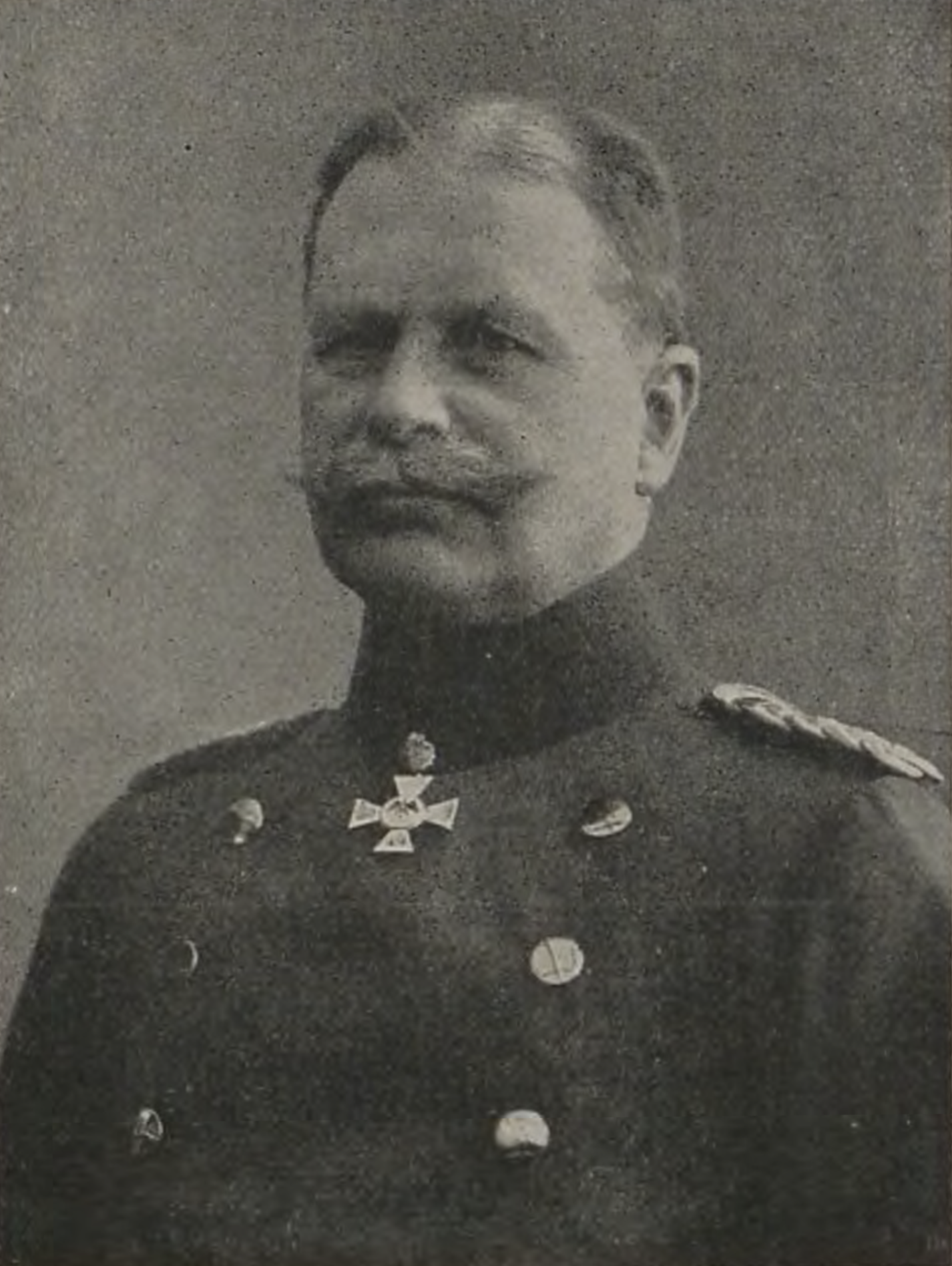
- Marwitz in 1915
- Born: 7 July 1856; Stolp, Province of Pomerania, Kingdom of Prussia
- Died: 27 October 1929 (aged 73); Wundichow, Province of Pomerania, Free State of Prussia, Weimar Republic
- Spouse: Helene von Kameke
- Relatives: Hans-Georg von der Marwitz (son)
- Military career
- Allegiance: German Empire
- Branch: Imperial German Army
- Service years: 1875–1918
- Rank: Inspector-General of Cavalry; General der Kavallerie
- Commands: XXXVIII Reserve Corps; VI Corps; Second Army; Fifth Army
- Conflicts: World War I; Battle of Haelen; Second Battle of the Masurian Lakes; Battle of Cambrai; Battle of Saint-Mihiel
- Awards: see below

Georg Cornelius Adalbert von der Marwitz (7 July 1856 – 27 October 1929) was a Prussian cavalry general, who commanded several Imperial German armies during the First World War on both the Eastern and Western fronts.

== Early military career ==
Marwitz was born in Stolp (Słupsk) in the Province of Pomerania and entered the Prussian Army in 1875. In 1881 he married Helene von Kameke, daughter of Prussian War Minister Georg von Kameke, with whom he had five children. From 1883 to 1886 he attended the Prussian Military Academy. Until 1900 he commanded a cavalry regiment, at which point he became chief of staff of XVIII Corps. Before the outbreak of the First World War he was the Inspector-General of Cavalry.

== World War I ==
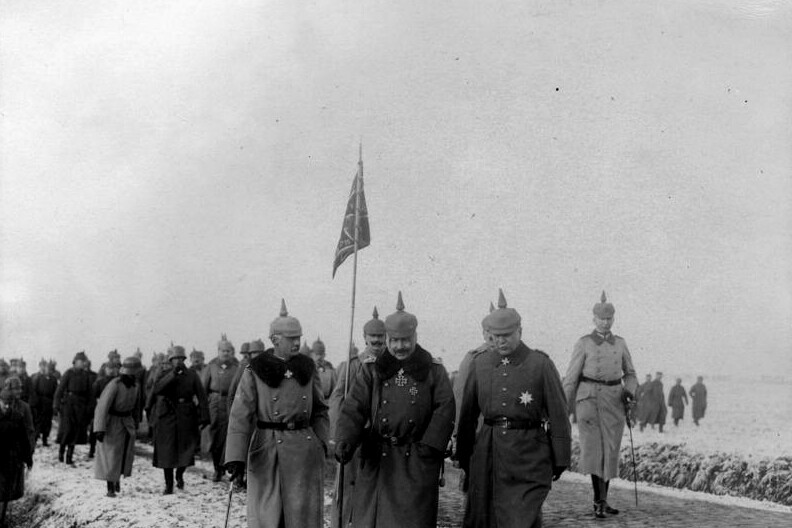
Marwitz (right) and the Kaiser on the way to visit troops near Cambrai in December 1917

Marwitz was assigned to the Western Front in 1914 as commander of II Cavalry Corps, and participated in the Battle of Haelen. After this first battle Marwitz was transferred to the Eastern Front to take command of the newly formed XXXVIII Reserve Corps, which he led in the Second Battle of the Masurian Lakes in the early winter of 1915. He was then transferred south and fought with Austria-Hungary against the Russians and was awarded the Pour le Mérite on 7 March 1915.

After recovering from an illness in the fall of 1915, Marwitz served on the Western Front as the commander of the VI Corps, before returning to the Eastern Front until the successful halting of the Russian Brusilov Offensive in June 1916. On 6 October 1916 he became adjutant to Kaiser Wilhelm II.

=== Command of the Second Army ===
In December 1916, Marwitz – a highly experienced and well-known officer, who sported a noticeable white moustache – was transferred from his post with the Kaiser, to take command of the Second Army on the Western Front. At that time, the German Army formed along the Siegfried-Stellung line, to Havrincourt Wood to la Vacquerie; a mile behind was the Hindenberg Support line. In front lay a strongly fortified line of trenches. Behind the Support Line was yet another system called the Beaurevoir-Masnieres-Marcoing Line. Each system was built with deep concrete bunkers, massed machine guns in cover, and as much as 50 yards of barbed wire in front. The planned Wotan Line to Cambrai, where Marwitz's Second Army was situated, was never completed. General Marwitz's command was four infantry divisions. For most of 1917, following instructions from his superior, Generalfeldmarschal Crown Prince Rupprecht, Marwitz kept his units busy with patrols and collecting intelligence, especially taking prisoners during trench raids on the British lines.

On 18 November 1917, Marwitz reported that troop dispositions unchanged. Despite statements by prisoners, the presence of camouflaged tanks, and air reconnaissance revealing a build-up in the rear, Marwitz concluded that an attack was unlikely. As a result, Marwitz was still in bed at the le Cateau HQ when he first heard of the British tank offensive toward Bourlon Ridge, which they had identified as a vital strategic target. The surprise was disabling to his infantry, exacerbated by cut communication lines. The Crown Prince, in command of Northern Group, informed Berlin. Marwitz was forced to contemplate total withdrawal. The morning of 21 November, Fontaine had already fallen, but the Second Army knew the allied strength and its dispositions. They ordered up Reserves, the 214th, 119th and 3rd Guards Divisions, all from the north Aisne and Flanders. Rupprecht ordered even more to support Marwitz's position. The Battle of Cambrai ensued, which saw the most extensive use of tanks to date, more than twice the previous number in one engagement, as well as new combined arms tactics. As the British had not adequately prepared for the strength of German defenses, on the morning of 26 November 1917, Rupprecht and Marwitz planned at le Cateau the first counteroffensive against the British since April 1915. The following afternoon, they were joined by Lieutenant-General von Kuhl, Group Chief of Staff, at a special conference of all Group commanders. Marwitz, who was under pressure from Ludendorff, remained silent, subdued, still reeling and shocked by the unconventional speed of the Allied attack. Marwitz's stormtroops destroyed many hundreds of tanks, but the allies had thousands of them. However, by the end of the month, the attack had petered out, and the tanks went into winter quarters. Marwitz and staff immediately determined to proceed with a counter-attack, and they did their best to recover enemy machines. A severe blizzard finally halted the fighting on 7 December. Of 50,000 German casualties, over 10,000 were taken prisoner, many due to ammunition shortages (reported to be prevalent since 1 December).

During the massive German offensive of Operation Michael, in March–April 1918, Second Army achieved the most significant advances, breaking through at the point in the line where French and British sectors met. However, these successes were halted at Villers-Bretonneux, where two understrength and hastily deployed Australian infantry brigades stepped into the gaps between British divisions.

Over the months following, facing British III Corps, Marwitz's Second Army held a vital part of the line for the Germans from the town of Albert to Hargicourt, his command opposed both French and British divisions, was composed of three corps and 14 divisions. However, Second Army, despite its paper strength, had serious manpower shortages. Its weakness lay in the fact that half the troops were recent recruits and of diminishing quality, following the reduction of previous minimum physical requirements. The sector was not as physically well defended as outsiders might have expected. Many positions did not possess deeply dug trenches. Communications trenches were under virtually permanent bombardment.

By 9 August, his commanders advised retreat behind the line of the River Somme. Crown Prince Rupprecht warned only a complete retreat to reform in a stronger position alongside Ninth Army would suffice; but Ludendorff turned down flat any idea of it; the line was to be held at all costs. The Second Army's defeat on 11 August 1918 was attributed to the allied tanks. But OHL blamed Marwitz, and shifted the burden onto his chief of staff, Major-General Erich von Tschischwitz. Marwitz's command was subjected to a reorganization with 18th and 9th Armies. The High Command threw every reserve into the Hindenburg Line. But units like the 2nd Guards Reserve Division and 4th Bavarian Division had long been in the line without relief; desperately tired, hungry, and needing 2,800 reinforcements to form a full complement. Desertion had become epidemic; the equivalent of three battalions had melted away. Marwitz told his diary the attrition was taking its toll, on morale and efficiency. On 24 August, Marwitz decorated one officer who had destroyed 14 tanks. But otherwise, tanks created panic and chaos in the German ranks; front-line troops who bound grenades together as makeshift anti-tank bombs and rifles were abandoned for heavy machine-guns, leaving artillery unprotected in the rearguard. On 26 August, Marwitz summarised his complaints, the men had endured "unspeakably hard conditions for such a terribly long time". The rail connections had not been made, disrupted by allied bombing. Air attacks were a problem for Marwitz Second Army: he was a victim himself by an "army of fliers", his staff stood with the men; one dud bomb penetrating Staff HQ. Marwitz saw the suffering at first hand for himself. On one day alone 120 bombs fell on Cambrai occupied by Second Army.

Meanwhile, the Allies had been planning massive operations to encircle Second Army from north and south, and outflank the town of Montdidier in an elaborate pincer movement. While the Allies prepared for everything, Marwitz left much to chance, knowing his forces were over-stretched. One of the strongest positions held by the German forces was the village of Peronne: surrounded by marshes, Marwitz had ordered the destruction of all bridges in the sector. The Australian Corps, headed by General Sir John Monash arrived on 26 August 1918, to prepare an assault over open ground that would normally have been extremely risky and vulnerable to German defensive fire and counterattacks. The Australians' attack on Mont Saint-Quentin and Peronne began at 05:00 on 30 August, with initial advances towards the heavily defended and elevated town of Mont Saint Quentin. Elite German units in advanced trenches defended the pock-marked trenches. The Kaiser Alexander Regiment held the hilltop with 600 men each in three battalions. A battalion of Australian veterans pushed the Germans out. The Germans had occupied the area since 1916, and Marwitz felt the defeat badly; it was a big dent to morale. The Germans had fought hard, but the previous attrition and deterioration in numbers and collective experience had taken their toll.

=== Command of Fifth Army ===
On 22 September 1918, Marwitz was transferred to command Fifth Army, consisting of nine divisions. He attempted to instill discipline in troops fleeing before allied tanks, "its just the fear of those things and not their actual effect", he wrote in his diary entry of 29 September. All along the Meuse-Argonne Front the Franco-American forces made progress north, supported by tanks; the Germans tried to reply with artillery and machine-gun fire proving stiff resistance.

On 3 October during the Argonne Offensive, Marwitz drove out to meet forward observation posts. His troops occupied the high ground. The US 1st Army faced an uphill climb from the plain into an area covered by woods, in which "are built-in machine guns, individual guns, mortars, surveillance posts..." concealing German troops. American artillery was ineffective. Although despondent, the Germans held their ground. US operations commenced at 5.30 am on 5 October from the east bank of the Meuse, but almost immediately they stalled in dark fog. The tactics had changed, the Germans were cheered by Group, but rumours of a possible peace sapped their morale.

By 1 November there were barely seven exhausted divisions on an 18 km front at Barricourt Heights. Marwitz's manoeuvrability was further hampered by shelled out roads and collapsed communications lines cutting off his HQ from front line commanders. Marwitz was in favour of withdrawing Fifth Army behind the relatively safety of the east bank of the Meuse, to re-group and get some rest, but OHL refused, sending strict orders to stand and fight. On 2 November, the Americans soon punched through the German positions, and Marwitz's centre line broke. General Hunter Liggett interpreted this as a weakness that had anticipated an attack on their right flank, but when it came in caused the line to collapse in depth. The capture of Barricount signalled a general rout. Marwitz issued an order that the Second Army must fight on, "The Fatherland Forever". Despite his unrealistic order, the armies began to disintegrate, at less than half battalions' fighting strength.

On 10 November, Marwitz left his post on the Meuse and called in to see Gallwitz. He demanded an armistice; the loss of Barricourt Heights, he told the Chief, had been the end. The French had reached Sedan on 6–7 November, and retreating Germans had left behind considerable quantities of equipment.

== Postwar ==
After the war, Marwitz withdrew from public life. He died at Wundichow in 1929 at the age of 73.

== Decorations and awards ==
- Order of the Crown, 1st class (Prussia)
- Knight of Justice of the Order of Saint John (Bailiwick of Brandenburg)
- Service Award (Prussia)
- Commander of the Merit Order of Philip the Magnanimous, 2nd Class, 5 June 1907 (Hesse and by Rhine)
- Honorary Grand Cross of the House and Merit Order of Peter Frederick Louis (Oldenburg)
- Commander of the House Order of the White Falcon (Weimar)
- Merit Cross, 2nd class (Waldeck)
- Order of the Double Dragon, 2nd level, first class (China)
- Commander of the Order of Saints Maurice and Lazarus
- Commander of the Order of Franz Joseph (Austria)
- Commander of the Order of the Lion and the Sun (Persia)
- Commander Grand Cross of the Royal Order of the Sword, 1911 (Sweden)
- Commander of the Order of the Crown of Thailand
- Iron Cross of 1914, 1st and 2nd classes
- Pour le Mérite, 7 March 1915; with Oak Leaves, 14 May 1915
- Grand Cross of the Order of the Red Eagle with Oak Leaves and Swords
- Star of the Commander's Cross of the House Order of Hohenzollern with Swords

Military offices
| Preceded by General der Artillerie Max von Gallwitz | Commander, 2nd Army; 17 December 1916 – 22 September 1918 | Succeeded by General der Infanterie Adolph von Carlowitz |
| Preceded by General der Artillerie Max von Gallwitz | Commander, 5th Army; 27 September 1918 – 30 January 1919 | Succeeded by Dissolved |
