= 28th Division (German Empire) =

28th Division (28. Division); from 2 August 1914: 28th Infantry Division (28. Infanterie-Division)
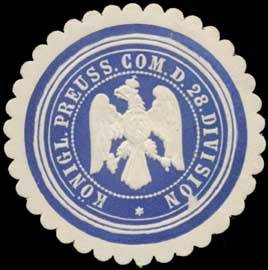
- Seal mark of the commander of the 28th Division
- Active: 1871-1919 (but see text)
- Country: Prussia/German Empire
- Branch: Imperial German Army
- Type: Infantry (in peacetime included cavalry)
- Size: Approx. 15,000
- Part of: XIV. Army Corps (XIV. Armeekorps)
- Garrison/HQ: Karlsruhe (1871-1919)
- Engagements: Franco-Prussian War: Siege of Strasbourg; Battle of the Lisaine; World War I: Battle of the Frontiers; Race to the Sea; Battle of Verdun; Battle of the Somme; Battle of Cambrai; German spring offensive; Third Battle of the Aisne; Battle of Belleau Wood; Second Battle of the Marne; Battle of Soissons

Commanders
- Notable commanders: Paul von Hindenburg, Max von Fabeck

The 28th Division (German: 28. Division) was a unit of the Prussian and German Army, almost entirely made up of troops from the Grand Duchy of Baden. It was formed in Karlsruhe on 1 July 1871. The division was subordinated in peacetime to the XIV Army Corps (XIV. Armeekorps). The 28th Division was disbanded in 1919 during the demobilization of the German Army after World War I.

The division, along with the other division of the XIV Army Corps, the 29th Division, was formed in the Grand Duchy of Baden, a member state of the German Empire. Both divisions grew out of the Grand Ducal Baden Division (Großherzoglich Badische Division), the army of the grand duchy. The Grand Ducal Baden Division had fought against Prussia in the Austro-Prussian War, but after Prussia's victory Baden and most other German states had entered into conventions subordinating their armies to Prussia's.

The Grand Ducal Baden Division served in the Franco-Prussian War against France in 1870–71, where its regiments saw action in the Siege of Strasbourg and the Battle of the Lisaine.

In peacetime, the 28th Division was stationed in northern Baden (the 29th covered southern Baden), with garrisons in Karlsruhe, Mannheim, Heidelberg and Rastatt, among other cities.

In World War I, the division served primarily on the Western Front, seeing action at the Battle of the Frontiers and then moving north during the Race to the Sea. It participated in some of the most well-known battles and campaigns of the Western Front, including the 1916 Battle of the Somme, the later phases of the Battle of Verdun, the tank battle of Cambrai in 1917, the German spring offensive of 1918, the Third Battle of the Aisne, the Battle of Belleau Wood, the Second Battle of the Marne and the Battle of Soissons. When the Armistice took effect, the division was occupying defensive positions on the right bank of the Meuse, in the northern part of the Argonne Forest.

== Pre-World War I organization ==
- 55th Infantry Brigade (55. Infanterie-Brigade)
  - 109th Baden Life Grenadier Regiment (Badisches Leib-Grenadier-Regiment Nr. 109)
  - 110th Baden Grenadier Regiment "Kaiser Wilhelm I" (2. Badisches Grenadier-Regiment Kaiser Wilhelm I. Nr. 110)
- 56th Infantry Brigade (56. Infanterie-Brigade)
  - 40th Fusilier Regiment "Prince Karl-Anton von Hohenzollern" (Füsilier-Regiment Fürst Karl-Anton von Hohenzollern (Hohenzollernsches) Nr. 40)
  - 111th Infantry Regiment "Margrave Ludwig Wilhelm" (Infanterie-Regiment Markgraf Ludwig Wilhelm (3. Badisches) Nr. 111)
- 28th Cavalry Brigade (28. Kavallerie-Brigade)
  - 20th Baden Life Dragoon Regiment (1. Badisches Leib-Dragoner-Regiment Nr. 20)
  - 21st Baden Dragoon Regiment (2. Badisches Dragoner-Regiment Nr. 21)
- 28th Field Artillery Brigade (28. Feldartillerie-Brigade)
  - 14th Baden Field Artillery Regiment "Grand Duke" (Feldartillerie-Regiment Großherzog (1. Badisches) Nr. 14)
  - 50th Baden Field Artillery Regiment (3. Badisches Feldartillerie-Regiment Nr. 50)

== August 1914 organization ==
On mobilization in August 1914 at the beginning of World War I, most divisional cavalry, including brigade headquarters, was withdrawn to form cavalry divisions or split up among divisions as reconnaissance units. Divisions received engineer companies and other support units from their higher headquarters. The 28th Division was renamed the 28th Infantry Division. Its initial wartime organization (major units) was as follows:

- 55th Infantry Brigade (55. Infanterie-Brigade)
  - 109th Baden Life Grenadier Regiment (Badisches Leib-Grenadier-Regiment Nr. 109)
  - 110th Baden Grenadier Regiment "Kaiser Wilhelm I" (2. Badisches Grenadier-Regiment Kaiser Wilhelm I. Nr. 110)
- 56th Infantry Brigade (56. Infanterie-Brigade)
  - 40th Fusilier Regiment "Prince Karl-Anton von Hohenzollern" (Füsilier-Regiment Fürst Karl-Anton von Hohenzollern (Hohenzollernsches) Nr. 40)
  - 111th Infantry Regiment "Margrave Ludwig Wilhelm" (Infanterie-Regiment Markgraf Ludwig Wilhelm (3. Badisches) Nr. 111)
- 5th Horse Jäger Regiment (Jäger-Regiment zu Pferde Nr. 5)
- 28th Field Artillery Brigade (28. Feldartillerie-Brigade)
  - 14th Baden Field Artillery Regiment "Grand Duke" (Feldartillerie-Regiment Großherzog (1. Badisches) Nr. 14)
  - 50th Baden Field Artillery Regiment (3. Badisches Feldartillerie-Regiment Nr. 50)
- 2nd Company, 14th Baden Engineer Battalion (2./Badisches Pionier-Bataillon Nr. 14)
- 3rd Company, 14th Baden Engineer Battalion (3./Badisches Pionier-Bataillon Nr. 14)

== Late World War I organization ==
Divisions underwent many changes during the war, with regiments moving from division to division, and some being destroyed and rebuilt. During the war, most divisions became triangular - one infantry brigade with three infantry regiments rather than two infantry brigades of two regiments (a "square division"). An artillery commander replaced the artillery brigade headquarters, the cavalry was further reduced, and the engineer contingent was increased. The 28th Infantry Division's order of battle on 26 May 1918 was as follows:

- 55th Infantry Brigade (55. Infanterie-Brigade)
  - 40th Fusilier Regiment "Prince Karl-Anton von Hohenzollern" (Füsilier-Regiment Fürst Karl-Anton von Hohenzollern (Hohenzollernsches) Nr. 40)
  - 109th Baden Life Grenadier Regiment (Badisches Leib-Grenadier-Regiment Nr. 109)
  - 110th Baden Grenadier Regiment "Kaiser Wilhelm I" (2. Badisches Grenadier-Regiment Kaiser Wilhelm I. Nr. 110)
  - 37th Machine Gun Sharpshooter Detachment (MG-Scharfschützen-Abteilung Nr. 37)
- 2nd Squadron, 5th Horse Jäger Regiment (2.Eskadron/Jäger-Regiment zu Pferde Nr. 5)
- Artillery Commander No. 28 (Artillerie-Kommandeur 28)
  - 14th Baden Field Artillery Regiment "Grand Duke" (Feldartillerie-Regiment Großherzog (1. Badisches) Nr. 14)
  - 55th Foot Artillery Battalion (Fußartillerie-Bataillon Nr. 55) - from 12 June 1918)
- 14th Baden Engineer Battalion Staff (Stab Badisches Pionier-Bataillon Nr. 14)
  - 2nd Company, 14th Baden Engineer Battalion (2./Badisches Pionier-Bataillon Nr. 14)
  - 3rd Company, 14th Baden Engineer Battalion (3./Badisches Pionier-Bataillon Nr. 14)
  - 28th Mortar Company (Minenwerfer-Kompanie Nr. 28)
- Divisional Signals Commander No. 28 (Divisions-Nachrichten-Kommandeur 28)

Paul von Hindenburg as commander of the 28th Division, 1900–1903.

== Notable commanders ==
- Paul von Hindenburg (1900–1903) - Later a Generalfeldmarschall and President of Germany.
- Max von Fabeck (1906–1910) - later commander of the 1st Army (1915–1916)
