= 12th Army (German Empire) =

German army group on the Eastern Front of World War I

12. Armee; 12th Army
- Flag of the Staff of an Armee Oberkommando (1871–1918)
- Active: 7 August 1915 – 9 October 1916
- Country: German Empire
- Type: Army
- Engagements: World War I

Insignia
- Abbreviation: A.O.K. 12

The 12th Army (German: 12. Armee / Armeeoberkommando 12 / A.O.K. 12) was an army level command of the German Army in World War I formed in August 1915 by the redesignation of Armee-Gruppe Gallwitz. It served exclusively on the Eastern Front and was dissolved on 9 October 1916 when its commander, General der Infanterie Max von Fabeck, was transferred to 8th Army.

== History ==
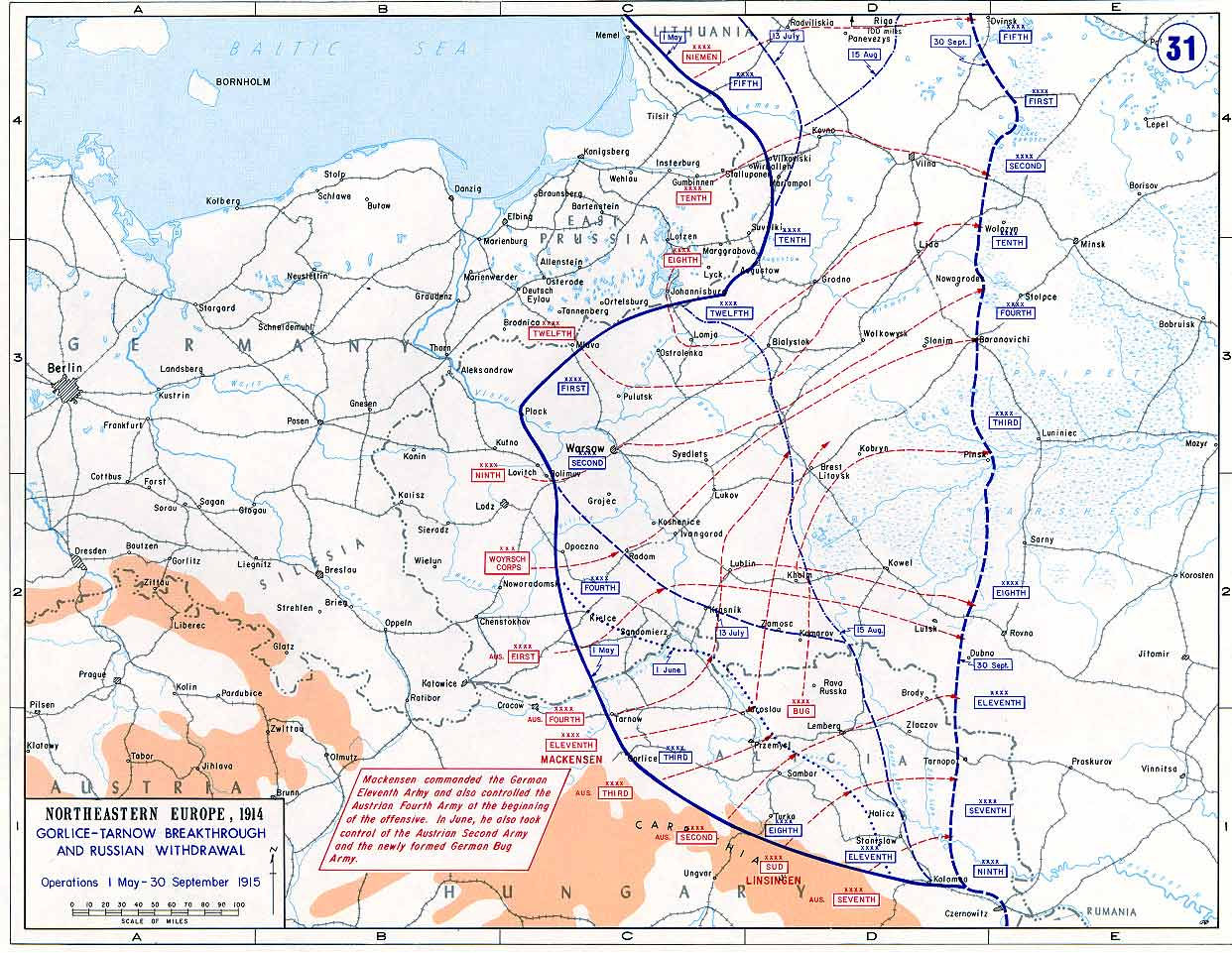
Russian withdrawal in 1915

On 9 February 1915 Guards Reserve Corps was redesignated Armee-Gruppe Gallwitz. Its commander was raised to the status of an Army Commander on 18 March 1915 and his Armee-Gruppe was redesignated as 12th Army on 7 August 1915.

On 22 July, the armies of Central Powers crossed the Vistula river. In August, the Russian Fourth Army left the Ivangorod fortress. With the continuing Russian retreat, Warsaw became isolated, and the 12th Army seized the opportunity and conquered it on 4–5 August.

== Commanders ==
Armee-Gruppe Gallwitz was redesignated as 12th Army on 7 August 1915 with von Gallwitz remaining in command. The 12th Army was dissolved on 9 October 1916 when its commander was transferred to 8th Army.

12th Army
From	Commander	Previously	Subsequently,
7 August 1915	General der Artillerie Max von Gallwitz	Armee-Gruppe Gallwitz	11th Army
22 September 1915	General der Infanterie Max von Fabeck	1st Army	8th Army

== Glossary ==
- Armee-Abteilung or Army Detachment in the sense of "something detached from an Army". It is not under the command of an Army so is in itself a small Army.
- Armee-Gruppe or Army Group in the sense of a group within an Army and under its command, generally formed as a temporary measure for a specific task.
- Heeresgruppe or Army Group in the sense of a number of armies under a single commander.

== See also ==
- 12th Army (Wehrmacht) for the equivalent formation in World War II
- Great Retreat (Russian)

== Bibliography ==
- Cron, Hermann (2002). Imperial German Army 1914–18: Organisation, Structure, Orders-of-Battle [first published: 1937]. Helion & Co. ISBN 1-874622-70-1.
- Ellis, John; Cox, Michael (1993). The World War I Databook. Aurum Press Ltd. ISBN 1-85410-766-6.
