= Army Group Gallwitz (German Empire) =

Army Group Gallwitz, or Army Group C, (German: Heeresgruppe Gallwitz) was an Army Group of the Imperial German Army during World War I. Commanded by Max von Gallwitz, it operated on the Western Front between 1 February and 11 November 1918.

== Composition ==
- German 5th Army (Max von Gallwitz, then Georg von der Marwitz)
- German Armee-Abteilung C (Georg Fuchs)

== Sources ==
- The Soldier's Burden
- Die Deutschen Heeresgruppen im Ersten Weltkrieg
- Bundesarchiv : Die deutschen Heeresgruppen Teil 1, Erster Weltkrieg
