= Max von Gallwitz =

German general during World War I

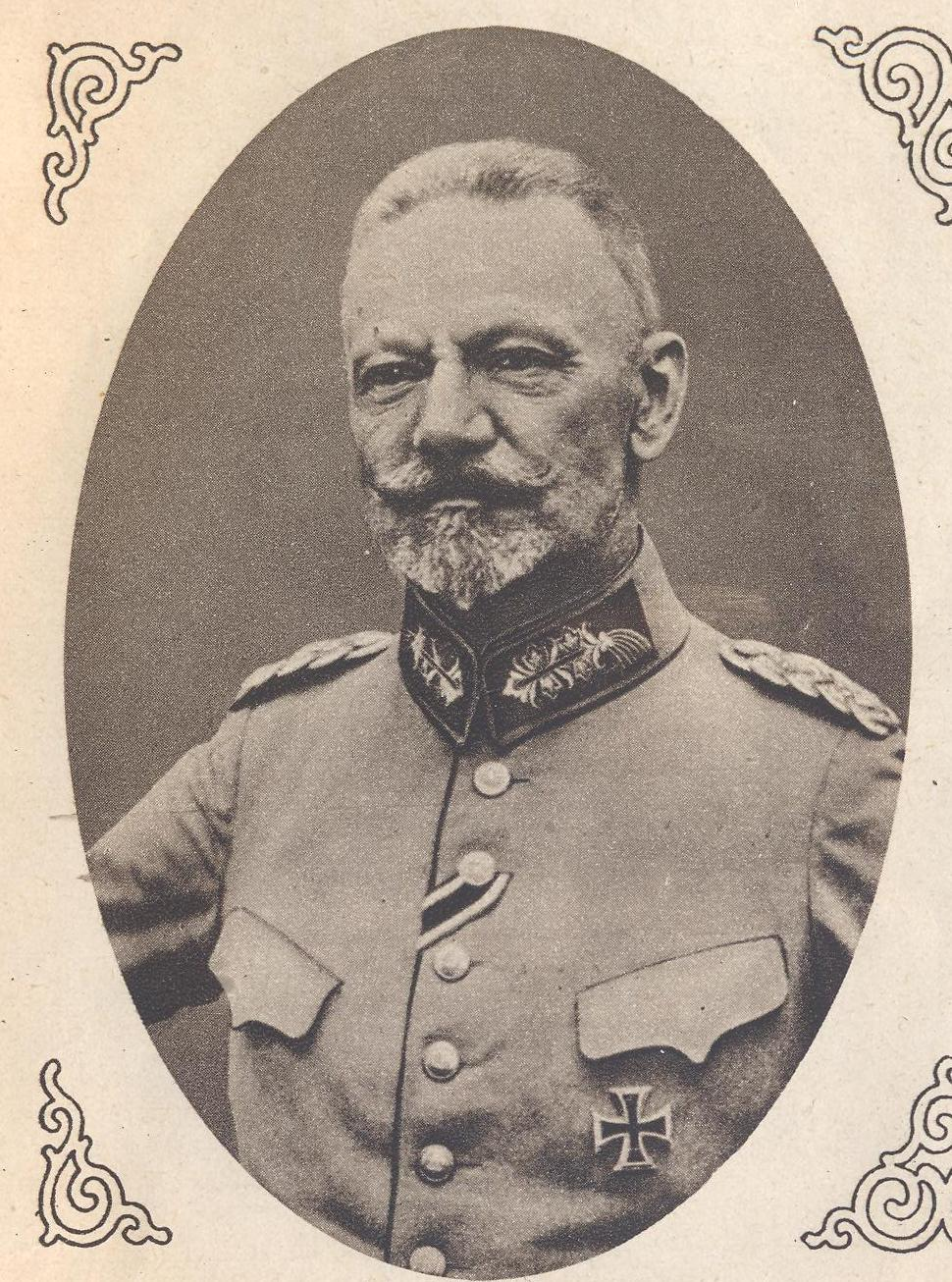
- Gallwitz on 13 July 1915
- Born: 2 May 1852; Breslau, Province of Silesia, Kingdom of Prussia (now Wrocław, Republic of Poland)
- Died: 18 April 1937 (aged 84); Naples, Kingdom of Italy (now Naples, Republic of Italy)
- Military career
- Allegiance: German Empire
- Branch: Imperial German Army
- Service years: 1870–1918
- Rank: General
- Commands: Guards Reserve Corps; Twelfth Army; Eleventh Army; Second Army; Fifth Army; Army Group Gallwitz
- Conflicts: Franco-Prussian War; World War I

Max Karl Wilhelm von Gallwitz (2 May 1852 – 18 April 1937) was a German general from Breslau (Wrocław), Silesia, who served with distinction during World War I on both the Eastern and Western Fronts.

== Biography ==
Gallwitz grew up in a Catholic family in Breslau and joined the Prussian Army in 1870. In 1891, he married Friedrike. They had a daughter and son Werner, who became a lieutenant general in the Second World War. Gallwitz was a First World War corps commander (Guards Reserve Corps) on the Western Front, but he was almost immediately transferred east to join the Eighth Army under Hindenburg. In 1915, he took command of Armee-Gruppe Gallwitz (later redesignated Twelfth Army) and participated in the Galicia offensive alongside Mackensen, who commanded the Eleventh Army.

Towards the end of 1915, Gallwitz succeeded Mackensen as commander of the Eleventh Army, as the latter campaigned against Serbia. In 1916, he moved back to the Western Front and defended against the British attack in the Battle of the Somme. He took over command of 2nd Army and of Heeresgruppe Gallwitz – Somme controlling the 1st and 2nd Armies. From 1916–18, he commanded the Fifth Army in the west, most notably engaging the Americans during the Battle of Saint-Mihiel.

Following his retirement from the army, Gallwitz served as a deputy in the Reichstag (1920–24) for the German National People's Party.

== Awards and decorations ==
- Pour le Mérite (24 July 1915), Oak Leaves added on 28 September 1915
- Grand Cross of the Order of the Red Eagle
- Order of the Black Eagle (23 December 1917)
- Iron Cross First and Second class

== Sources ==
- DiNardo, Richard L. (2015). Invasion: The Conquest of Serbia, 1915. Santa Barbara: Praeger. ISBN 9781440800924.
- Jung, Jakob (1995). Max von Gallwitz (1852–1937) (in German). Biblio. p. 292. ISBN 978-3-7648-2435-8.

Military offices
Preceded by New Formation	Commander, Guards Reserve Corps; 2 August 1914 – 9 February 1915	Succeeded by Upgraded to Armee-Gruppe Gallwitz
Preceded by Upgraded from Guards Reserve Corps	Commander, Armee-Gruppe Gallwitz; 9 February – 7 August 1915	Succeeded by Upgraded to 12th Army
Preceded by Upgraded from Armee-Gruppe Gallwitz	Commander, 12th Army; 7 August – 22 September 1915	Succeeded by General der Infanterie Max von Fabeck
Preceded by Generalfeldmarschall August von Mackensen	Commander, 11th Army; 23 September 1915 – 16 April 1916	Succeeded by General der Infanterie Arnold von Winckler
Preceded by General der Infanterie Fritz von Below	Commander, 2nd Army; 19 July – 17 December 1916	Succeeded by General der Kavallerie Georg von der Marwitz
Preceded by General der Infanterie Ewald von Lochow	Commander, 5th Army; 17 December 1916 – 27 September 1918	Succeeded by General der Kavallerie Georg von der Marwitz
Preceded by New creation	Commander, Army Group Gallwitz; 1 February – 11 November 1918	Succeeded by Dissolved
