= Battle of Caporetto order of battle =

Order of battle

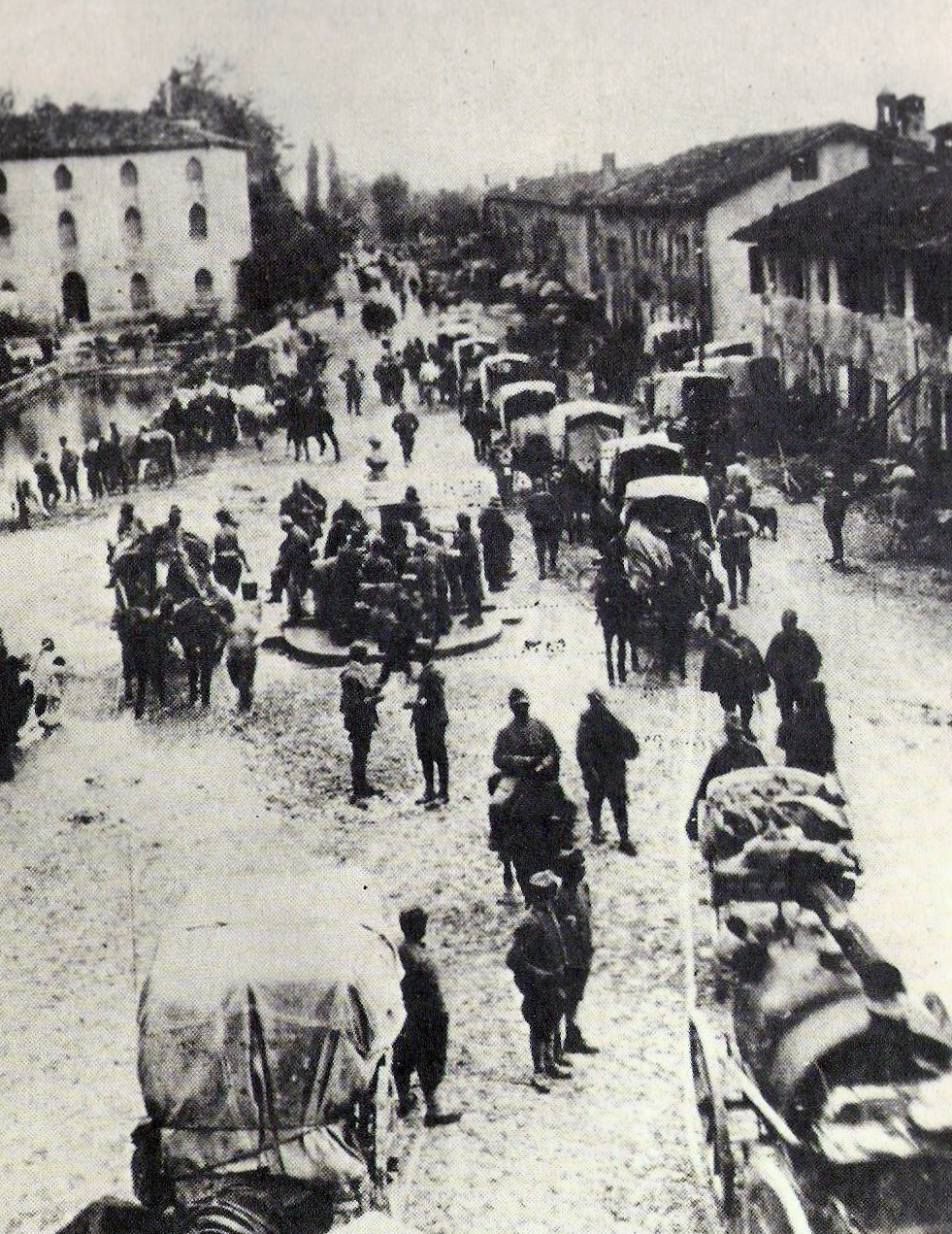
Italian troops in Caporetto, 24 October 1917

The Battle of Caporetto (also known as the Twelfth Battle of the Isonzo or the Battle of Karfreit as it was known by the Central Powers; Slovene: Čudež pri Kobaridu), took place from 24 October to 19 November 1917, near the town of Kobarid (now in Slovenia), on the Austro-Italian front of World War I. The battle was named after the Italian name of the town of Kobarid (known as Karfreit in German).

== Italian Army ==
=== Outline order of battle ===
Organization of the Italian 2nd Army on 24 October 1917
	Corps	Division
In 1st Line	IV Corps	50th Infantry Division
In 1st Line	IV Corps	43rd Infantry Division
In 1st Line	IV Corps	46th Infantry Division
In 1st Line	IV Corps	34th Infantry Division (Corps Reserve)
In 1st Line	XXVII Corps	19th Infantry Division
In 1st Line	XXVII Corps	65th Infantry Division
In 1st Line	XXVII Corps	22nd Infantry Division
In 1st Line	XXVII Corps	64th Infantry Division
In 1st Line	XXVII Corps	Corps Reserve
In 1st Line	XXIV Corps	49th Infantry Division
In 1st Line	XXIV Corps	68th Infantry Division
In 1st Line	XXIV Corps	10th Infantry Division
In 1st Line	II Corps	67th Infantry Division
In 1st Line	II Corps	44th Infantry Division
In 1st Line	II Corps	8th Infantry Division
In 1st Line	II Corps	Corps Reserve
In 1st Line	VI Corps	66th Infantry Division
In 1st Line	VI Corps	24th Infantry Division
In 1st Line	VIII Corps	48th Infantry Division
In 1st Line	VIII Corps	59th Infantry Division
In 1st Line	VIII Corps	7th Infantry Division
In 2nd Line	VII Corps	3rd Infantry Division
In 2nd Line	VII Corps	62nd Infantry Division
In 2nd Line	VII Corps	Corps Reserve
In 2nd Line	XIV Corps (Army Reserve)	20th Infantry Division
In 2nd Line	XIV Corps (Army Reserve)	30th Infantry Division
In 2nd Line	XXVIII Corps (Army Reserve)	23rd Infantry Division
In 2nd Line	XXVIII Corps (Army Reserve)	47th Infantry Division
In 2nd Line	Reserve of the Supreme Command	60th Infantry Division (attached to VIII Corps)
In 2nd Line	Reserve of the Supreme Command	53rd Infantry Division (attached to XIV Corps)
In 2nd Line	Reserve of the Supreme Command	13th Infantry Division (attached to XXVIII Corps)

=== Detailed order of battle ===
Italian 2nd Army (Lieutenant General Luigi Capello)

In 1st line:

- IV Corps (Lieutenant General Alberto Cavaciocchi)
  - 50th Infantry Division (Major General Giovanni Arrighi)
    - Brigade "Friuli" – 87th Infantry Regiment and 88th Infantry Regiment
    - 280th Infantry Regiment (Brigade "Foggia")
    - 2nd Alpini Group — Alpini battalions "Ceva", "Mondovì", and "Monviso"
    - Alpini battalions: "Borgo San Dalmazzo", "Dronero", and "Saluzzo"
  - 43rd Infantry Division (Lieutenant General Angelo Farisoglio)
    - Brigade "Genova" – 97th Infantry Regiment and 98th Infantry Regiment
    - 223rd Infantry Regiment (Brigade "Etna")
    - 5th Alpini Group — Alpini battalions "Monte Albergian", "Val Chisone", and "Belluno"
    - 9th Bersaglieri Regiment
  - 46th Infantry Division (Lieutenant General Giulio Amadei)
    - Brigade "Caltanissetta" – 147th Infantry Regiment and 148th Infantry Regiment
    - Brigade "Alessandria" – 155th Infantry Regiment and 156th Infantry Regiment
    - 224th Infantry Regiment (Brigade "Etna")
    - 2nd Bersaglieri Regiment
  - 34th Infantry Division, Corps reserve
    - Brigade "Foggia" – 281st Infantry Regiment and 282nd Infantry Regiment
    - Alpini Battalion "Monte Argentera"
- XXVII Corps (Lieutenant General Pietro Badoglio)
  - 19th Infantry Division (Major General Giovanni Villani)
    - Brigade "Napoli" – 75th Infantry Regiment and 76th Infantry Regiment
    - Brigade "Spezia" – 125th Infantry Regiment and 126th Infantry Regiment
    - Brigade "Taro" – 207th Infantry Regiment and 208th Infantry Regiment (less 1 battalion)
  - 65th Infantry Division
    - Brigade "Belluno" – 274th Infantry Regiment, I Battalion and II Battalion/ 275th Infantry Regiment
  - 22nd Infantry Division
    - Brigade "Pescara" – 211th Infantry Regiment and 212th Infantry Regiment
  - 64th Infantry Division
    - Brigade "Belluno" – 276th Infantry Regiment, III Battalion/ 275th Infantry Regiment
    - Brigade "Taro" – II Battalion/ 208th Infantry Regiment
  - Corps reserve:
    - 10th Alpini Group — Alpini battalions "Vicenza", "Monte Berico", "Morbegno", and "Val d'Adige"
    - Brigade "Puglie" – 71st Infantry Regiment and 72nd Infantry Regiment (already in line)
    - Brigade "Roma" – 79th Infantry Regiment and 80th Infantry Regiment (already in line)
- XXIV Corps (Lieutenant General Enrico Caviglia)
  - 49th Infantry Division
    - Brigade "Ravenna" – 37th Infantry Regiment and 38th Infantry Regiment
    - Brigade "Lambro" – 205th Infantry Regiment and 206th Infantry Regiment (on the morning of 24 October, transferred to XIV Corps, replaced by the Brigade "Palermo")
    - Brigade "Sele" – 219th Infantry Regiment and 220th Infantry Regiment
  - 68th Infantry Division
    - Brigade "Grosseto" – 237th Infantry Regiment and 238th Infantry Regiment
  - 10th Infantry Division
    - Brigade "Verona" – 85th Infantry Regiment and 86th Infantry Regiment
    - Brigade "Campobasso" – 229th Infantry Regiment and 230th Infantry Regiment
- II Corps (Major General Alberico Albricci)
  - 67th Infantry Division
    - Brigade "Cremona" – 21st Infantry Regiment and 22nd Infantry Regiment
    - Brigade "Tortona" – 257th Infantry Regiment and 258th Infantry Regiment
  - 44th Infantry Division
    - Brigade "Re" – 1st Infantry Regiment and 2nd Infantry Regiment
    - Brigade "Brescia" – 19th Infantry Regiment and 20th Infantry Regiment
  - 8th Infantry Division
    - Brigade "Udine" – 95th Infantry Regiment and 96th Infantry Regiment
    - Brigade "Forlì" – 43rd Infantry Regiment and 44th Infantry Regiment
  - Corps reserve:
    - Brigade "Aquila" – 269th Infantry Regiment and 270th Infantry Regiment
- VI Corps (Lieutenant General Giacomo Lombardi)
  - 66th Infantry Division
    - Brigade "Cuneo" – 7th Infantry Regiment and 8th Infantry Regiment
    - Brigade "Abruzzi" – 57th Infantry Regiment and 58th Infantry Regiment
    - Brigade "Milano" – 159th Infantry Regiment and 160th Infantry Regiment (tactically available to the army Infantry Regiment and detached to XXVIII Corps)
  - 24th Infantry Division
    - Brigade "Emilia" – 119th Infantry Regiment and 120th Infantry Regiment
    - Brigade "Gaeta" – 263rd Infantry Regiment and 264th Infantry Regiment
- VIII Corps (Major General Francesco Grazioli)
  - 48th Infantry Division
    - Brigade "Piemonte" – 3rd Infantry Regiment and 4th Infantry Regiment
    - Brigade "Porto Maurizio" – 253rd Infantry Regiment and 254th Infantry Regiment
  - 59th Infantry Division
    - Brigade "Modena" – 41st Infantry Regiment and 42nd Infantry Regiment
    - Brigade "Pesaro" – 239th Infantry Regiment and 240th Infantry Regiment
  - 7th Infantry Division
    - Brigade "Bergamo" – 25th Infantry Regiment and 26th Infantry Regiment
    - Brigade "Lucca" – 163rd Infantry Regiment and 164th Infantry Regiment
  - Brigade "Sesia" – 201st Infantry Regiment and 202nd Infantry Regiment (fortified town of Gorizia, tactically available to the army)

In 2nd line:

- VII Corps (Major General Luigi Bongiovanni)
  - 3rd Infantry Division
    - Brigade "Arno" – 213th Infantry Regiment and 214th Infantry Regiment
    - Brigade "Elba" – 261st Infantry Regiment and 262nd Infantry Regiment
  - 62nd Infantry Division
    - Brigade "Salerno" – 89th Infantry Regiment and 90th Infantry Regiment
    - IV Bersaglieri Brigade – 14th Bersaglieri Regiment Infantry Regiment and 20th Bersaglieri Regiment
  - Corps reserve:
    - Brigade "Firenze" – 127th Infantry Regiment and 128th Infantry Regiment
- XIV Corps (Lieutenant General Sagramoso) – Army Reserve Command
  - 20th Infantry Division
    - Brigade "Livorno" – 33rd Infantry Regiment and 34th Infantry Regiment
    - Brigade "Palermo" – 67th Infantry Regiment and 68th Infantry Regiment
  - 30th Infantry Division
    - Brigade "Treviso" – 115th Infantry Regiment and 116th Infantry Regiment
    - Brigade "Girgenti" – 247th Infantry Regiment and 248th Infantry Regiment
- XXVIII Corps (Major General Saporiti) – Army Reserve Command
  - 23rd Infantry Division
    - Brigade "Venezia" – 83rd Infantry Regiment and 84th Infantry Regiment
    - Brigade "Messina" – 93rd Infantry Regiment and 94th Infantry Regiment
    - Brigade "Sassari" – 151st Infantry Regiment and 152nd Infantry Regiment
    - Brigade "Avellino" – 231st Infantry Regiment and 232nd Infantry Regiment
  - 47th Infantry Division
    - I Bersaglieri Brigade – 6th Bersaglieri Regiment and 12th Bersaglieri Regiment
    - V Bersaglieri Brigade – 4th Bersaglieri Regiment and 21st Bersaglieri Regiment
  - Brigade "Milano" – 159th Infantry Regiment and 160th Infantry Regiment (detached from the 66th Infantry Division, VI Corps)
- Reserves of the Supreme Command
  - 60th Infantry Division (attached to VIII Corps)
    - Brigade "Ferrara" – 47th Infantry Regiment and 48th Infantry Regiment
    - Brigade "Taranto" – 143rd Infantry Regiment and 144th Infantry Regiment
  - 53rd Infantry Division (attached to XIV Corps)
    - Brigade "Vicenza" – 277th Infantry Regiment, 278th Infantry Regiment and 279th Infantry Regiment
    - Brigade "Potenza" – 271st Infantry Regiment, 272nd Infantry Regiment and 273rd Infantry Regiment
  - 13th Infantry Division (attached to XXVIII Corps)
    - Brigade "Ionio" – 221st Infantry Regiment and 222nd Infantry Regiment
    - Brigade "Massa Carrara" – 251st Infantry Regiment and 252nd Infantry Regiment
  - Brigade "Teramo" – 241st Infantry Regiment and 242nd Infantry Regiment (attached to XXVIII Corps)

== German and Austro-Hungarian Armies ==
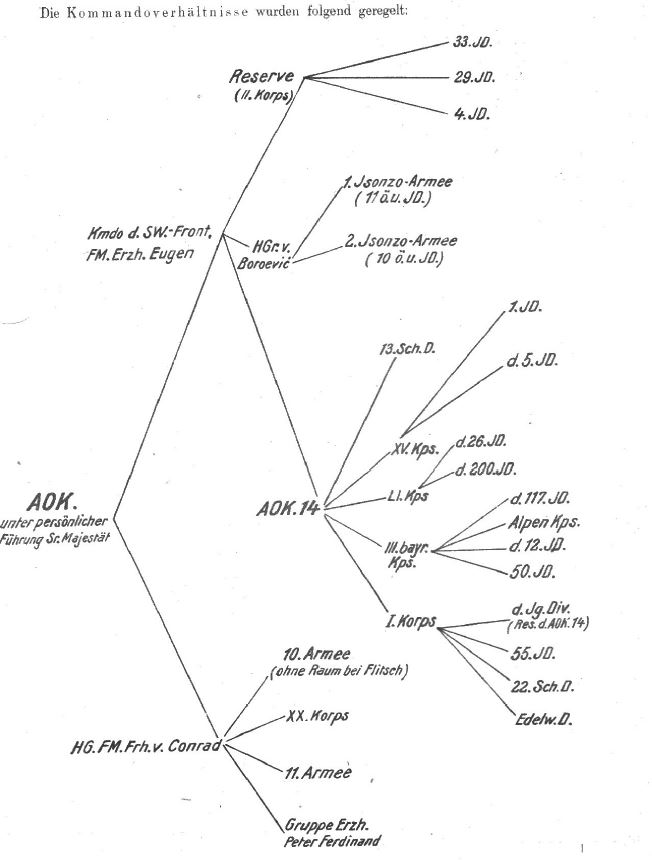
Chain of command of the German - Austro-Hungarian Army

=== Outline order of battle ===
Organization of the German and Austro-Hungarian Armies on 24 October 1917
Army	Corps	Division
German 14th Army	Group Krauss; Austro-Hungarian I Corps	Austro-Hungarian 3rd "Edelweiss" Infantry Division
German 14th Army	Group Krauss; Austro-Hungarian I Corps	Austro-Hungarian 22nd Schützen Division
German 14th Army	Group Krauss; Austro-Hungarian I Corps	Austro-Hungarian 55th Infantry Division
German 14th Army	Group Krauss; Austro-Hungarian I Corps	German Jäger Division
German 14th Army	Group Stein; German III Bavarian Corps	Austro-Hungarian 50th Infantry Division
German 14th Army	Group Stein; German III Bavarian Corps	German 12th Infantry Division
German 14th Army	Group Stein; German III Bavarian Corps	German 117th Infantry Division
German 14th Army	Group Stein; German III Bavarian Corps	German Alpenkorps
German 14th Army	Group Berrer; German 51st Corps	German 26th (1st Württemberg) Infantry Division
German 14th Army	Group Berrer; German 51st Corps	German 200th Infantry Division
German 14th Army	Group Scotti; Austro-Hungarian XV Corps	Austro-Hungarian 1st Infantry Division
German 14th Army	Group Scotti; Austro-Hungarian XV Corps	German 5th Infantry Division
German 14th Army	Army Reserve	Austro-Hungarian 4th Infantry Division
German 14th Army	Army Reserve	Austro-Hungarian 13th Schützen Division
German 14th Army	Army Reserve	Austro-Hungarian 33rd Infantry Division
German 14th Army	Later reinforcements	Austro-Hungarian 35th Infantry Division (from 2nd Isonzo Army)
German 14th Army	Later reinforcements	Austro-Hungarian 94th Infantry Division
Army Group Boroević Austro-Hungarian 2nd Isonzo Army (part)	Group Kosak	Austro-Hungarian 60th Infantry Division
Army Group Boroević Austro-Hungarian 2nd Isonzo Army (part)	Group Kosak	Austro-Hungarian 35th Infantry Division (later to 14th Army)
Army Group Boroević Austro-Hungarian 2nd Isonzo Army (part)	Group Kosak	Austro-Hungarian 57th Infantry Division

=== Secondary attacks ===
- South Tyrolean Army Group (Franz Conrad von Hötzendorf)
  - 10th Army (Alexander von Krobatin)
  - 11th Army (Viktor Graf von Scheuchenstuel)
  - XX Army Corps (Josef Roth)
  - Gruppe Erzherzog Peter Ferdinand (Archduke Peter Ferdinand of Austria)

=== Detailed order of battle ===
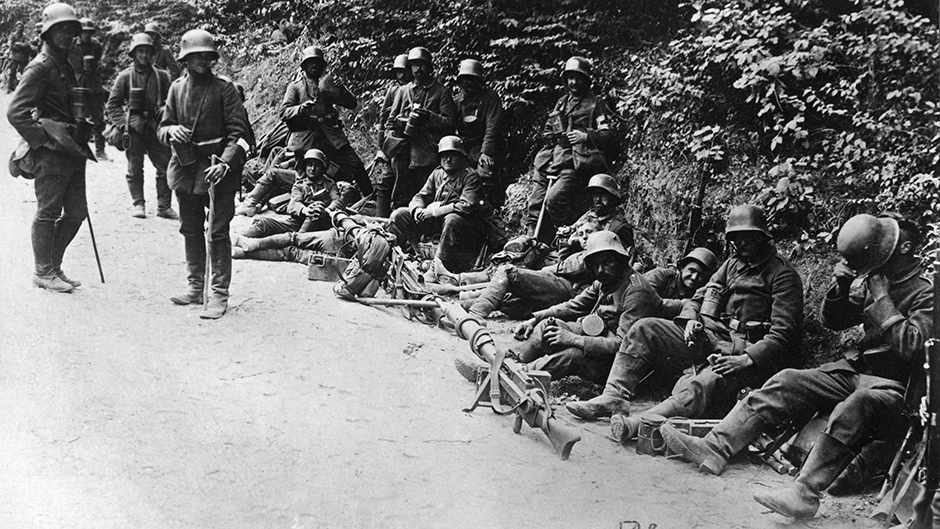
German assault troops at Caporetto

German 14th Army (General der Infanterie Otto von Below)

- Austro-Hungarian I Corps (Group Krauss – General der Infanterie Alfred Krauß)
  - Austro-Hungarian 3rd Infantry Division "Edelweiss" (Generalmajor Heinrich Wieden Edler von Alpenbach)
    - 216th Infantry Brigade
      - 59th Infantry Regiment "Erzherzog Rainer"
      - 4th Kaiserjäger Regiment (1 bn. only)
    - 217th Infantry Brigade
      - 14th Infantry Regiment "Ernst Ludwig Großherzog von Hessen und bei Rhein"
      - 3rd Kaiserjäger Regiment
  - Austro-Hungarian 22nd Schützen Division (Generalmajor Rudolf Müller)
    - 4th Schützen Brigade
      - III Kaiserschützen Regiment "Innichen" (less 1 bn.)
      - 26th Schützen Regiment "Marburg"
    - 98th Schützen Brigade
      - I Kaiserschützen Regiment "Trient"
      - II Kaiserschützen Regiment "Bozen"
  - Austro-Hungarian 55th Infantry Division (Generalmajor Felix Prinz zu Schwarzenberg)
    - 55th Sturmbataillon
    - 26th Mountain Infantry Brigade
      - 4th Bosnia/Herzegovina Infantry Regiment
      - 7th Infantry Regiment "Graf von Khevenhüller"
    - 38th Infantry Brigade
      - 2nd Bosnia/Herzegovina Infantry Regiment
      - 4th Bosnia/Herzegovina Infantry Regiment (1 bn. only)
      - 7th Infantry Regiment "Graf von Khevenhüller" (1 bn. only)
  - German Jäger Division (Colonel von Wodkte)
    - 5th Ersatz Infantry Brigade
      - 11th Jäger Regiment
        - Staff of 4th Dragoons Regiment
        - Guards Reserve Jäger Battalion
        - Guards Reserve Schützen Battalion
        - 1st Jäger Battalion
      - 12th Jäger Regiment
        - Staff of 2nd Uhlans Regiment
        - 2nd Jäger Battalion
        - 7th Jäger Battalion
        - 1st Reserve Jäger Battalion
      - 13th Jäger Regiment
        - Staff of 8th Bavarian Chevaulégers Regiment
        - 8th Reserve Jäger Battalion
        - 20th Reserve Jäger Battalion
        - 21st Reserve Jäger Battalion
      - Sturmbataillon "Kronprinz Rupprecht" (Bavaria)
      - Sturmbataillon "Deutscher Kronprinz" (Bavaria)
      - Sturmbataillon "Herzog Albrecht" (Bavaria)
      - Württemberg Mountain Battalion, (later detached to the Alpenkorps)
- III Bavarian Corps (Group Stein – Generalleutnant Hermann Freiherr von Stein)
  - Austro-Hungarian 50th Infantry Division (Generalmajor Karl Geřabek)
    - 3rd Mountain Infantry Brigade
      - 30th Infantry Regiment "Schoedler" (1 bn. only)
      - 33rd Infantry Regiment "Kaiser Leopold II" (1 bn. only)
      - 46th Infantry Regiment (1 bn. only)
      - 80th Infantry Regiment "Wilhelm Ernst Großherzog von Sachsen-Weimar-Eisenach, Herzog zu Sachsen" (1 bn. only)
      - 25th Feldjäger Battalion
      - 155th Landsturm Regiment
    - 15th Mountain Infantry Brigade
      - 1st Bosnia/Herzegovina Infantry Regiment (less 1 bn.)
      - 18th Infantry Regiment "Erzherzog Leopold Salvator" (1 bn. only)
      - 37th Infantry Regiment "Erzherzog Joseph" (1 bn. only)
      - 61st Infantry Regiment "Ritter von Frank" (1 bn. only)
  - German 12th Infantry Division (Generalmajor Arnold Lequis)
    - 24th Infantry Brigade
      - 23rd (2nd Upper Silesian) Infantry Regiment "von Winterfeldt"
      - 62nd (3rd Upper Silesian) Infantry Regiment
      - 63rd (4th Upper Silesian) Infantry Regiment
  - German 117th Infantry Division (Generalmajor Paul Seydel)
    - 233rd Infantry Brigade
      - 157th (4th Silesian) Infantry Regiment
      - 11th Reserve Infantry Regiment
      - 22nd Reserve Infantry Regiment
  - German Alpenkorps (Generalmajor Ludwig von Tutschek)
    - 1st Bavarian Jäger Brigade
      - Royal Bavarian Infantry Lifeguards Regiment
      - 1st Bavarian Jäger Regiment
        - 1st Bavarian Jäger Battalion "King"
        - 2nd Bavarian Jäger Battalion
        - 2nd Bavarian Reserve Jäger Battalion
      - 2nd Jäger Regiment
        - 10th Jäger Battalion
        - 10th Reserve Jäger Battalion
        - 14th Reserve Jäger Battalion
- German 51st Corps (Group Berrer – Generalleutnant Albert von Berrer to 28 October 1917 then von Hofacker)
  - German 26th (1st Württemberg) Infantry Division (Generalleutnant Eberhard von Hofacker)
    - 51st Infantry Brigade
      - 119th (1st Württemberg) Grenadier Regiment "Queen Olga"
      - 121st (3rd Württemberg) (Old Württemberg) Infantry Regiment
      - 125th (7th Württemberg) Infantry Regiment "Emperor Frederick, King of Prussia"
  - German 200th Infantry Division (Generalmajor Hans von Below)
    - 2nd Jäger Brigade
      - 3rd Jäger Regiment
        - 1st (Bavarian) Ski Battalion
        - 2nd Ski Battalion
        - 3rd Ski Battalion
        - 4th (Bavarian) Ski Battalion
      - 4th Jäger Regiment
        - 11th Jäger Battalion
        - 5th Reserve Jäger Battalion
        - 6th Reserve Jäger Battalion
      - 5th Jäger Regiment
        - 17th Reserve Jäger Battalion
        - 18th Reserve Jäger Battalion
        - 23rd Reserve Jäger Battalion
- Austro-Hungarian XV Corps (Group Scotti – Feldmarschalleutnant Karl Scotti)
  - Austro-Hungarian 1st Infantry Division (Feldmarschalleutnant Joseph Metzger)
    - 7th Mountain Infantry Brigade
      - 5th Infantry Regiment "Freiherr von Klobucar" (1 bn. only)
      - 25th Infantry Regiment "Edler von Pokorny" (1 bn. only)
      - 53rd Infantry Regiment "Dankl" (1 bn. only)
      - 66th Infantry Regiment "Erzherzog Peter Ferdinand" (1 bn. only)
      - 86th Infantry Regiment "Freiherr von Steininger" (1 bn. only)
      - 3rd Bosnia/Herzegovina Feldjäger Battalion
    - 22nd Mountain Infantry Brigade
      - 4th Bosnia/Herzegovina Infantry Regiment (1 bn. only)
      - 17th Feldjäger Battalion
      - 31st Feldjäger Battalion
      - 37th Schützen Regiment "Gravosa" (2 bns.)
      - 92nd Infantry Regiment "Edler von Hortstein"
  - German 5th Infantry Division (Generalmajor Hasso Georg von Wedel)
    - 10th Infantry Brigade
      - 8th (1st Brandenburg) Life Grenadier Regiment "King Frederick William III"
      - 12th (2nd Brandenburg) Grenadier Regiment "Prince Charles of Prussia"
      - 52nd (6th Brandenburg) Infantry Regiment "von Alvensleben"
- Army Reserve
  - Austro-Hungarian 4th Infantry Division (Generalmajor Rudolf Pfeffer)
    - 7th Infantry Brigade
      - 88th Infantry Regiment
      - 99th Infantry Regiment
    - 8th Infantry Brigade
      - 8th Infantry Regiment "Erzherzog Karl Stephan"
      - 49th Infantry Regiment "Freiherr von Hess"
  - Austro-Hungarian 13th Schützen Division (Feldmarschalleutnant Franz Kalser Edler von Maasfeld)
    - 25th Schützen Brigade
      - 1st Schützen Regiment "Wien"
      - 24th Schützen Regiment "Wien"
    - 26th Schützen Brigade
      - 14th Schützen Regiment "Brünn"
      - 25th Schützen Regiment "Kremsier"
  - Austro-Hungarian 33rd Infantry Division (Generalmajor Artur Iwański)
    - 65th Infantry Brigade
      - 19th Infantry Regiment "Erzherzog Franz Ferdinand"
      - 36th Infantry Regiment "Reichsgraf Browne"
    - 66th Infantry Brigade
      - 12th Infantry Regiment "Parmann"
      - 83rd Infantry Regiment "Freiherr von Schikovsky"
- Later reinforcements to the 14th Army
  - Austro-Hungarian 35th Infantry Division (Feldmarschalleutnant Eugen von Podhoránszky) (from 2nd Isonzo Army)
    - 69th Infantry Brigade
      - 51st Infantry Regiment "von Boroeviċ"
      - 63rd Infantry Regiment "Freiherr von Pitreich"
    - 70th Infantry Brigade
      - 62nd Infantry Regiment "Ludwig III, König von Bayern"
      - 64th Infantry Regiment "Ritter von Auffenberg"
  - Austro-Hungarian 94th Infantry Division (Generalmajor Marcel Ławrowski Edler von Plöcken)
    - Group Lesachtal
      - 148th Landsturm Battalion
      - Salzsburg Volunteer Schützen Battalion
      - Styria Volunteer Schützen Battalion
    - 25th Mountain Infantry Brigade
      - 18th Schützen Regiment "Przemyšl" (1 bn. only)
      - 8th Feldjäger Battalion
      - ??? Ersatz Feldjäger Battalion
      - 26th Landsturm Regiment (1 bn. only)
      - 30th Landsturm Battalion
    - 57th Mountain Infantry Brigade
      - 26th Landsturm Regiment (2 bns.)
      - 151st Landsturm Battalion
      - 157th Landsturm Battalion
      - ???th Sturmbataillon

Army Group "Boroević" (Generaloberst Svetozar Boroević)
Austro-Hungarian 2nd Isonzo Army (part) (General der Infanterie Johann Ritter von Henriquez)

- Austro-Hungarian Group Kosak (Feldmarschalleutnant Ferdinand Kosak)
  - Austro-Hungarian 60th Infantry Division (Feldmarschalleutnant Ludwig Goiginger)
    - 2nd Mountain Infantry Brigade
      - 8th Infantry Regiment "Erzherzog Karl Stephan" (1 bn. only)
      - 52nd Infantry Regiment "Erzherzog Friedrich" (1 bn. only)
      - 55th Infantry Regiment (1 bn. only)
      - 70th Infantry Regiment "Edler von Appel" (1 bn. only)
      - 12th Feldjäger Battalion
      - 8th Bosnia/Herzegovina Feldjäger Battalion
    - 10th Mountain Infantry Brigade
      - 20th Infantry Regiment "Heinrich Prinz von Preußen" (1 bn. only)
      - 21st Infantry Regiment "Graf von Abensperg und Traun" (1 bn. only)
      - 47th Infantry Regiment "Graf von Beck-Rzikowsky" (1 bn. only)
      - 90th Infantry Regiment "Edler von Horsetzky" (1 bn. only)
      - 1st Bosnia/Herzegovina Feldjäger Battalion
      - 4th Bosnia/Herzegovina Feldjäger Battalion
  - Austro-Hungarian 35th Infantry Division (Feldmarschalleutnant Eugen von Podhoránszky) (later to 14th Army)
    - 69th Infantry Brigade
      - 51st Infantry Regiment "von Boroevic"
      - 63rd Infantry Regiment "Freiherr von Pitreich
    - 70th Infantry Brigade
      - 62nd Infantry Regiment "Ludwig III, König von Bayern"
      - 64th Infantry Regiment "Ritter von Auffenberg"
  - Austro-Hungarian 57th Infantry Division (Generalmajor Joseph Hrozný Edler von Bojemil)
    - 5th Infantry Brigade
      - 22nd Infantry Regiment "Graf von Lacy" (less 1 Bn.)
      - 57th Infantry Regiment "Prinz zu Sachsen-Coburg-Saalfeld"
      - 2nd Landsturm Regiment (1 bn. only)
    - 18th Infantry Brigade
      - 87th Infantry Regiment "Freiherr von Succovaty"
      - 34th Infantry Regiment "Wilhelm I, Deutscher Kaiser und König von Preußen" (1 bn. only)
      - 69th Infantry Regiment "Freiherr von Leithner" (1 bn. only)
      - 8th Feldjäger Battalion

== Bibliography ==
- Cron, Hermann (2002). Imperial German Army 1914–18: Organisation, Structure, Orders-of-Battle [first published: 1937]. Helion & Co. ISBN 1-874622-70-1.
- Haythornthwaite, Philip J. (1996). The World War One Source Book. Arms and Armour. ISBN 1-85409-351-7.
- Histories of Two Hundred and Fifty-One Divisions of the German Army which Participated in the War (1914–1918), compiled from records of Intelligence section of the General Staff, American Expeditionary Forces, at General Headquarters, Chaumont, France 1919. The London Stamp Exchange Ltd. 1989 [1920]. ISBN 0-948130-87-3.
