= Eberhard von Hofacker =

WW1 German army general (1861-1928)

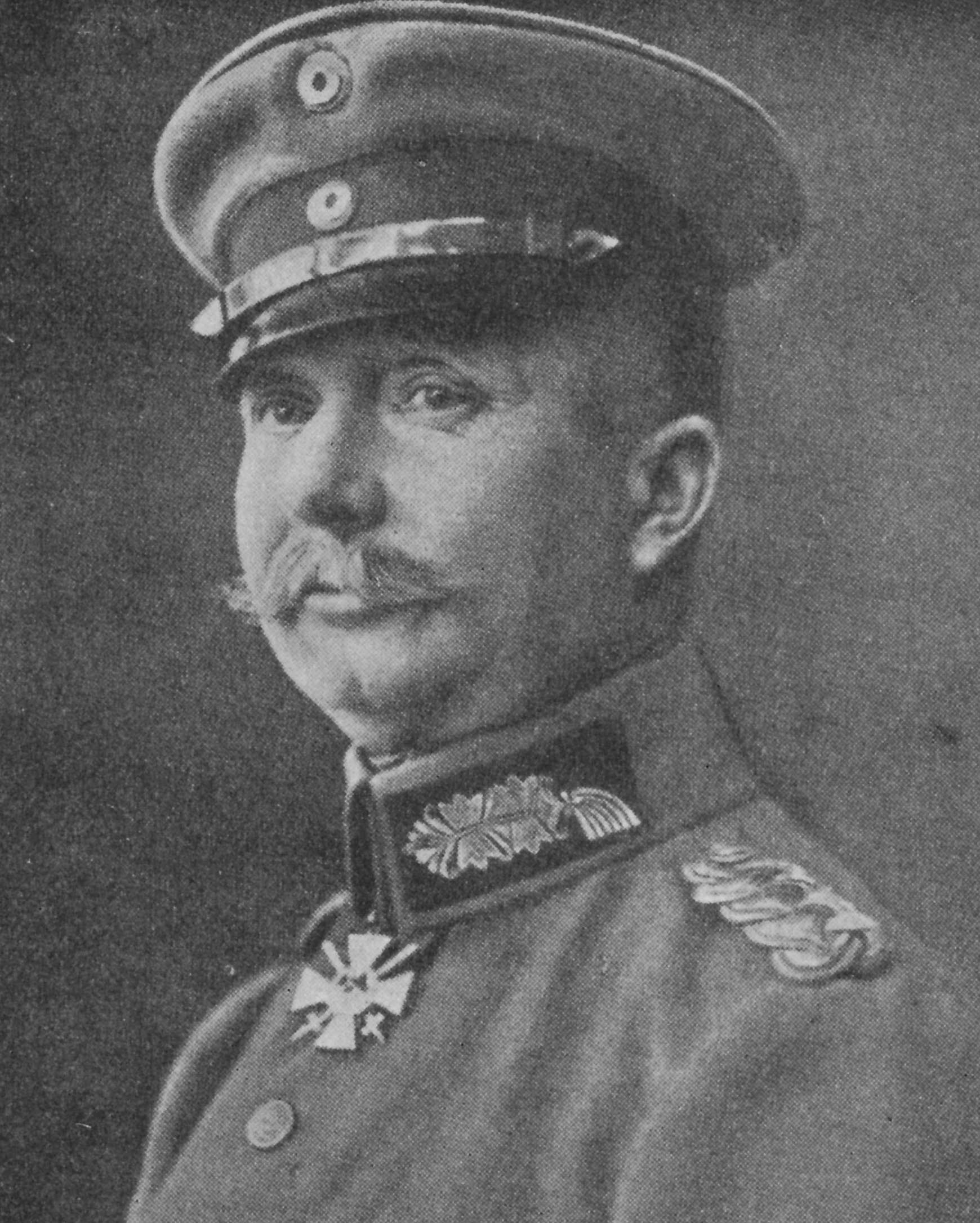
- Born: 25 June 1861; Hemmingen, Kingdom of Württemberg
- Died: 19 January 1928 (aged 66); Tübingen, Germany
- Relatives: Caesar von Hofacker (son)
- Military career
- Allegiance: German Empire
- Branch: Imperial German Army
- Service years: 1879–1919
- Rank: Generalleutnant
- Commands: 20th (2nd Württemberg) Uhlans "King William I"; 45th Cavalry Brigade; 11th Infantry Brigade; 4th Landwehr Division; 5th Cavalry Division; 82nd Reserve Division; 22nd Reserve Division; 26th (1st Royal Württemberg) Division; 51st Corps
- Conflicts: World War I; Battle of Caporetto; Battle of Amiens (1918)
- Awards: Pour le Mérite with Oakleaves

Eberhard Alfred Konrad Karl von Hofacker (25 June 1861, in Hemmingen – 19 January 1928, in Tübingen) was a Württemberg army officer who was a Generalleutnant in the First World War and awarded the Pour le Mérite with oak leaves.

== Early life and military career ==
On 29 September 1879 he joined the 25th (1st Württemberg) Dragoons "Queen Olga" in Ludwigsburg as an Officer Cadet. On 10 May 1880 he was appointed ensign, and on 6 February 1881 he was promoted to second lieutenant. From 28 March 1886, he served as regimental adjutant and was in this position on 18 December 1888 when promoted to first lieutenant. From 21 July 1891 to 11 September 1894, he was assigned to the Prussian Military Academy. This was followed by appointment as squadron commander with the 25th Dragoons and promotion to captain on 12 September 1894. In 1898, Hofacker was adjutant to the 26th Division (1st Royal Württemberg). From 16 December 1899 to 17 October 1901 he served on the General Staff in Berlin with promotion in May 1901 to major. He was then First General Staff Officer in the General Staff of the 21st Division, from 27 January 1903 in the same role at the 26th Division, and from 27 April 1904 likewise with the XIII (Royal Württemberg) Corps. On 21 June 1906 he was promoted to lieutenant colonel as an aide of Kaiser Wilhelm II and the commander of the Palace Guard Company. Two years later he was named commander of the 20th (2nd Württemberg) Uhlans "King William I". On 7 September 1909 Hofacker was promoted to colonel. On 24 July 1910 he was promoted to Generalmajor and appointed as chief of staff of XVIII Army Corps. His final peacetime appointment from 1 October 1912 was as commander of the 45th Cavalry Brigade in Saarlouis.

== World War I ==
At the outbreak of the war, he was serving with the 45th Cavalry Brigade which, on mobilisation, was assigned to the 6th Cavalry Division on the Western Front. Subsequently, he was given command of the 4th Landwehr Division and from 15 December 1915 the 5th Cavalry Division on the Eastern Front in the Pripet marshes. From 13 August 1916 he commanded the 82nd Reserve Division and during this time was promoted to Generalleutnant (1 November). On 22 December 1916 he briefly took command of 22nd Reserve Division before transferring to command the 26th Division on 6 January 1917. He led this division in the Battle of Arras and for his performance he was awarded the Pour le Mérite on 26 April 1917.

He was transferred with his division to the Italian Front in September 1917 to help shore up the Austro-Hungarian Army (as part of 51st Corps, 14th Army). During the Battle of Caporetto he took command of 51st Corps from 3 November when its previous commander, Generalleutnant Albert von Berrer, was killed in action. He was awarded the Oakleaves to the Pour le Mérite (signifying a second award) on 24 November 1917.

On 23 January 1918 the 14th Army Command was recalled (to form a new 17th Army on the Western Front). The German troops remaining on the Italian front came under the command of 51st Corps until it was also withdrawn in February 1918. Back on the Western Front, he commanded 51st Corps in the Battle of Amiens in August 1918.

== Later life ==
From 23 August 1918, Hofacker was put on active reserve status (temporary retirement). After the war Hofacker was deputy director of the Württemberg military academy. He retired from active duty on 8 May 1919.

== Family ==
Eberhard von Hofacker was married to Albertine, Countess of Üxküll-Gyllenband. Their son Caesar von Hofacker was involved in the 20 July plot to kill Adolf Hitler.

== Awards ==
- Pour le Mérite with oak leaves
  - Pour le Mérite on 26 April 1917
  - Oak leaves on 24 November 1917

Military offices
Preceded by Generalleutnant Albert von Berrer	Commander, 51st Corps; 3 November 1917 - 23 August 1918	Succeeded by Generalleutnant Hans von Below
