= 2nd Lancers =

2nd Lancers or 2nd Lancers Regiment may refer to the following military units:

- 2nd Lancers (Gardner's Horse), Bengal Army, British Indian Army, and Indian Army unit
- 2nd Lancers Regiment of the Belgian Army, later amalgamated into the 2nd/4th Lancers Regiment
- 2nd Lancers Regiment (Portugal)
- 2nd Württemberg Uhlans, later the 20th (2nd Württemberg) Uhlans "King William I"
