= 51st Corps (German Empire) =

51st Corps (Generalkommando zbV 51)
- Flag of the Staff of a Generalkommando (1871–1918)
- Active: September 1916-1919
- Disbanded: 1919
- Country: German Empire
- Branch: Army
- Engagements: World War I Battle of Caporetto

Insignia
- Abbreviation: Genkdo zbV 51

The 51st Corps (German: Generalkommando zbV 51) was a corps formation of the German Army in World War I. It was formed in September 1916 and was still in existence at the end of the war.

== Chronicle ==
The 51st Corps (z.b.V.) was formed in September 1916. With the onset of trench warfare, the German Army recognised that it was no longer possible to maintain the traditional Corps unit, that is, one made up of two divisions. Whereas at some times (and in some places) a Corps of two divisions was sufficient, at other times 5 or 6 divisions were necessary. Therefore, under the Hindenburg regime (from summer 1916), new Corps headquarters were created without organic divisions. These new Corps were designated General Commands for Special Use (German: Generalkommandos zur besonderen Verwendung).

The 51st Corps was sent to the Italian Front in September 1917 to help shore up the Austro-Hungarian Army. It commanded 26th (1st Württemberg) and 200th Divisions and played a prominent part in the Battle of Caporetto under 14th Army. Following the successful offensive, the front soon froze again in trench warfare. The German High Command decided to withdraw its forces again to use on other fronts. On 23 January 1918 the Army Command was recalled (to form a new 17th Army on the Western Front). The German troops remaining on the Italian front came under the command of 51st Corps until it was withdrawn in February 1918.

By the end of the war, the Corps was serving on the Western Front as part of 2nd Army, Heeresgruppe Kronprinz Rupprecht with the following composition:

- 2nd Cyclist Brigade
- 243rd Division
- 121st Division
- 54th Division
- 1st Guards Reserve Division
- 22nd Reserve Division

== Commanders ==
The 51st Corps had the following commanders during its existence:

Commander	From	To
Generalleutnant Albert von Berrer	27 August 1916	28 October 1917
Generalleutnant Eberhard von Hofacker	3 November 1917	23 August 1918
Generalleutnant Hans von Below	23 August 1918	end of war

== See also ==
- German Army (German Empire)
- German Army order of battle, Western Front (1918)

== Bibliography ==
- Cron, Hermann (2002). Imperial German Army 1914-18: Organisation, Structure, Orders-of-Battle [first published: 1937]. Helion & Co. ISBN 1-874622-70-1.
- Ellis, John; Cox, Michael (1993). The World War I Databook. Aurum Press Ltd. ISBN 1-85410-766-6.
