= Luigi Bongiovanni =

Italian general

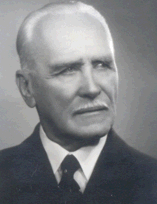

Italian Governor of Cyrenaica
- In office December 1922 – 24 May 1924
- Preceded by: Eduardo Baccari
- Succeeded by: Ernesto Mombelli

Personal details
- Born: 8 December 1866 Reggio Emilia
- Died: April 4, 1941 (aged 74) Rome

Luigi Bongiovanni (1866–1941) was an Italian general. He was a governor of Antalya in 1919 and of Cyrenaica from December 1922 to May 1924

== Life ==
He was born in Reggio Emilia in 1866.

During the battle of Caporetto in World War I, he commanded VII corps of the Italian 2nd Army. Before that he participated in Boxer Rebellion, then in the Italo-Turkish War. During the "Grande Guerra" served in the Trentino front. After World War I he served as the Italian military governor of Antalya, which was under Italian occupation at the time.

In 1917 he received the italian silver medal for military valor.

From January 1922 to May 1924 he was Governor of Italian Cyrenaica.

In 1924 a flight accident forced B. to leave the Cyrenaica governorship (24 May 1924); retired, he was appointed member (and from 1927 president of the section) of the "Superior Council of the Colonies". Senator in 1929, r. commissioner of the Agronomic Institute for Italian Africa in the period 1930-35, he continued to deal with colonial and military problems, also collaborating on various magazines and writing books.Giorgio Rochat

He was senator of the kingdom of Italy since 1928 (when he become a member of Fascist Party main rulers) until his death (because of heart attack) in 1941.

== Books & Articles ==
- Bombardamenti dal cielo, in Nuova antologia. 02/16/1932.
- La "Marna": giudizi in contrasto, in Nuova antologia. 01/16/1934.
- Problemi dell'Etiopia italiana, in Nuova antologia. 06/1/1936.

== Awards & Decorations ==
- Cavaliere dell'Ordine della Corona d'Italia; 8 June 1905
- Commendatore dell'Ordine della Corona d'Italia; 4 June 1914
- Grande ufficiale dell'Ordine della Corona d'Italia; 8 August 1921
- Gran cordone dell'Ordine della Corona d'Italia; 18 April 1931
- Cavaliere dell'Ordine dei SS. Maurizio e Lazzaro; 14 January 1916
- Ufficiale dell'Ordine dei SS. Maurizio e Lazzaro; 31 May 1919
- Commendatore dell'Ordine dei S.S. Maurizio e Lazzaro; 18 December 1921
- Cavaliere dell'Ordine militare di Savoia; 5 August 1917
- Grande ufficiale dell'Ordine coloniale della Stella d'Italia; 26 April 1923
- Gran cordone dell'Ordine coloniale della Stella d'Italia; 1 May 1924

== Bibliography ==
- Basilio Di Martino, "La Fanteria italiana nella Grande Guerra". Storia Militare, n. 217, Parme, Ermanno * Albertelli Editore, octobre 2011, pp. 49–57, (ISSN 1122-5289).
- Ovidio Ferrante, "Il Corpo Militare Aeronautico nel 1918":, n. 2, Rome, Stato Maggiore dell'Aeronautica Militare, octobre 2008, pp. 104–111, (ISSN 1122-5289).
