= Mario Soldarelli =

Italian general during World War II

- Born: 21 January 1886; Florence, Kingdom of Italy
- Died: 27 April 1962 (aged 76); Rome, Italy
- Military career
- Allegiance: Kingdom of Italy
- Branch: Royal Italian Army
- Service years: 1908–1946
- Rank: Lieutenant General
- Commands: 15th Artillery Regiment; 60th Infantry Division Sabratha; 6th Infantry Division Cuneo; Campania Military Command; Naples Territorial Defence; Rome Territorial Defence
- Conflicts: World War I; Battles of the Isonzo; World War II; Battle of the Western Alps; North African campaign; Siege of Tobruk; Operation Crusader; Battle of Gazala; First Battle of El Alamein; Dodecanese campaign
- Awards: Silver Medal of Military Valor (twice); Military Order of Savoy; Order of the Crown of Italy; Order of Saints Maurice and Lazarus; Order of Merit of the Italian Republic

Mario Soldarelli (Florence, 21 January 1886 – Rome, 27 April 1962) was an Italian general during World War II.

== Biography ==
He was born in Florence on 21 January 1886, and entered the Royal Military Academy of Artillery and Engineers of Turin in 1905, graduating as artillery second lieutenant on 3 August 1908, assigned to the 1st Fortress Artillery Regiment. He subsequently attended the Army Application School and then the War School. He participated in the First World War serving initially within the 8th Infantry Division and later with the 10th Infantry Division, with the rank of captain and later major, earning two Silver Medals for Military Valor.

In 1934 he was promoted to colonel and given command of the 15th Artillery Regiment, and was then assigned to the Army Command of Verona. On 30 June 1939 he was promoted to brigadier general, and after a period in command of the artillery of the Army Corps of Trieste, he assumed the position of Chief of Staff of the Fourth Army, participating in the brief offensive against France after Italy's entry into World War II, in June 1940.

On 25 April 1941 he assumed command of the 60th Infantry Division Sabratha, fighting in North Africa, being promoted to major general on 1 January 1942. He remained in Egypt until 6 August 1942, even after his division had been dissolved owing to the losses sustained in the First Battle of El Alamein. He remained attached to the Armed Forces High Command North Africa, for special assignments, until 15 January 1943.

On 16 January 1943 he was given command of the 6th Infantry Division Cuneo, stationed in the Sporades Islands, with headquarters in Samos. After the Armistice of Cassibile in September 1943 and the fall of Rhodes, he assumed command of all Army troops in the Aegean islands; his forces were reinforced by British troops and opposed the German takeover in the Dodecanese campaign, until in November 1943 they were forced to abandon the islands and retreat to Palestine, where they were interned. Soldarelli was then repatriated to Allied-controlled southern Italy.

From 15 July 1944 to 1 April 1945 he held the command of the territorial defence of Naples, and from 2 April 1945 to 20 December 1946 that of Rome. He was then transferred to the Army reserve and promoted to Lieutenant General.

On the proposal of the Presidency of the Council of Ministers, on 2 June 1954 he was awarded the honor of Grand Officer of the Order of Merit of the Italian Republic. He died in Rome in 1962.
