= Ernesto Mombelli =

Italian general (1867–1932)

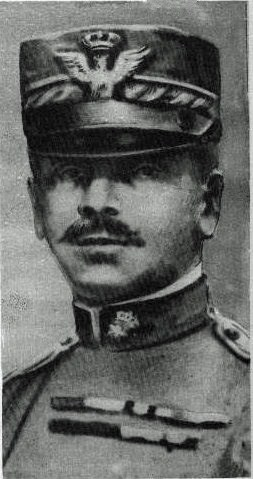

Italian Governor of Cyrenaica
- In office 16 June 1924 – 2 December 1926
- Preceded by: Luigi Bongiovanni
- Succeeded by: Attilio Teruzzi

Personal details
- Born: 12 June 1867 Turin, Kingdom of Italy
- Died: 1932 (aged 64–65)

Ernesto Mombelli (12 June 1867 – 1932) was an Italian general. He was the governor of Italian Cyrenaica from mid-1924 to December 1926.

Formerly fought in the Italo-Turkish War, then, during the First World War, he led the Italian 35th division in the Macedonian front from 1917 to 1918. During the occupation of Constantinople by the Allies following the war he was the commander of the Italian forces stationed in Istanbul.

For his service in Macedonia, and his representation of his home country in the inter-allied military mission to Hungary, he was awarded the US army's distinguished service medal by US president.

== See also ==
- Vardar Offensive
