= Caesar von Hofacker =

German Luftwaffe Lieutenant Colonel

- Caesar von Hofacker
- Born: 2 March 1896; Ludwigsburg, Kingdom of Württemberg, German Empire
- Died: 20 December 1944 (aged 48); Berlin, Plötzensee Prison, Nazi Germany
- Cause of death: Execution by hanging
- Relatives: Eberhard von Hofacker (father); Claus von Stauffenberg (cousin)
- Military career
- Allegiance: German Empire; Weimar Republic; Nazi Germany
- Branch: Luftwaffe
- Service years: 1914–1920; 1939–1944
- Rank: Lieutenant Colonel
- Conflicts: World War I; World War II
- Other work: Jurist

Caesar von Hofacker (German pronunciation: [ˈtsɛːzaʁ fɔn ˈhoːfˌʔakɐ]; sometimes Cäsar; 2 March 1896 – 20 December 1944) was a German Luftwaffe Lieutenant Colonel and leading member of the 20 July plot against Adolf Hitler.

== Family ==
Caesar von Hofacker was the son of Eberhard von Hofacker, who later became Lieutenant General of the Royal Württemberg Army, and his wife Albertine (1872–1946), née Countess von Üxküll-Gyllenband, a cousin of the resistance fighter Nikolaus Count von Üxküll-Gyllenband. His great-aunt was Hildegard von Spitzemberg; Claus Schenk Count von Stauffenberg was his cousin. The Prussian army reformer August Neidhardt von Gneisenau was his great-great-grandfather.

In 1927, von Hofacker married Ilse-Lotte Pastor (1898–1974), a grandniece of Friedrich Engels. The marriage produced five children: Eberhard (1928–2001), Anna-Luise (1929), Christa (1932), Alfred (1935) and Lieselotte (1938).

== Career ==
=== World War I and Interwar Period ===
On 8 August 1914, after the outbreak of World War I, Hofacker enlisted as a volunteer in the Uhlan regiment King Wilhelm I (2nd Württemberg) No. 20, formerly commanded by his father, and served in the 1st Squadron from 12 December 1914. On 7 May 1915, he was promoted to corporal, on 4 December 1915 to vice sergeant of the reserve, and on 30 March 1916 to lieutenant of the reserve. On 7 June 1916, he was transferred to the reserve squadron, and on 25 December 1916, he was transferred to the 5th Air Force Reserve Division for training as a pilot. After passing his exam, Hofacker was assigned to the 69th Field Aviation Division, where he was awarded the Golden Military Merit Medal on 20 February 1917. On 3 April 1917, at the request of King William II of Württemberg, he was transferred back to the regiment's reserve squadron. On 10 May 1917, he was transferred to the 26th Division and assigned to the German military mission in Turkey. As a first lieutenant, he was taken prisoner by the French on 20 October 1918. He was released from captivity on 14 March 1920 and discharged from military service on 17 March 1920.

After studying law in Tübingen, he obtained his doctorate in law in 1925 and joined Vereinigte Stahlwerke in Berlin in 1927, becoming an authorised signatory in 1936. In 1931, he joined the Stahlhelm association of front-line soldiers.

=== World War II ===
At the outbreak of war, Caesar von Hofacker was enlisted in the Luftwaffe as a reserve officer. He served during the Invasion of Poland in the 2nd Squadron of Reconnaissance Group 10. After the end of the Battle of France, he was assigned to the administrative staff of the Militärbefehlshaber in Frankreich. The Militärbefehlshaber based in Paris was responsible for the military and economic administration of the occupied regions of France and, from November 1942, the unoccupied regions as well.

== Resistance to Nazism ==
=== Administrative staff of the Militärbefehlshaber ===
As liaison officer to the French steel industry, Hofacker had become a member of the administrative staff of the Militärbefehlhaber in Paris, the centre of German resistance against National Socialism in France. According to Wilhelm Ritter von Schramm, who kept the war diary for the Commander-in-Chief West in La Roche-Guyon, von Hofacker acted in this position as 'the real leader of the resistance movement in the West'. He enjoyed the trust of the military commander, General of the Infantry Carl-Heinrich von Stülpnagel. Stülpnagel had already been part of the Oster conspiracy against Adolf Hitler in September 1938. Other members of the conspiracy in General Stülpnagel's administrative staff were, Elmar Michel (head of the economic department, 1897-1977), Walter Bargatzky, Major Max Horst (brother-in-law of General Hans Speidel) Friedrich Freiherr von Teuchert (1902–1986), Gotthard von Falkenhausen (banker, 1899–1982) and Judge Rudolf Thierfelder.

Hofacker's main role in the events culminating in the attempted assassination of Hitler at the Wolf's Lair on 20 July 1944 consisted of acting as a secret liaison between his cousin, Claus Graf Schenk von Stauffenberg, and another plotter in occupied Paris, General Carl-Heinrich von Stülpnagel, France's military governor, to whom he was personal adviser. Hofacker assessed the chances of the coup attempt as "only ten percent". He had a point of introduction to Field Marshal Erwin Rommel as Rommel had served under Hofacker's father in World War I; Rommel considered the elder Hofacker something of a hero. Hofacker tried to draw Rommel into the plot to rid Germany of Hitler, but although Rommel gave his backing to the conspiracy Rommel did not agree that Hitler should be killed.

On 26 July 1944, Hofacker was arrested in Paris, taken to Berlin Gestapo headquarters where, according to William Shirer in The Rise and Fall of the 3rd Reich, he was horrifically tortured and gave up the name of Erwin Rommel, stating that Rommel said to "Tell the people in Berlin they can count on me". This was support for the conspiracy to overthrow Hitler, not to kill him – yet this made no difference to Hitler, who ordered the forced suicide of Erwin Rommel and a false hero's funeral. The torture confession was taken down and Hofacker was put on trial before the Volksgerichtshof. He was found guilty of treason and sentenced to death. He was hanged at Plötzensee Prison in Berlin.

== Sources ==
- Shirer, William Lawrence (1960). The Rise and Fall of the Third Reich: A History of Nazi Germany. New York City: Simon & Schuster. ASIN B0766DKDLR. LCCN 60006729. OCLC 1286630. OL 5794925M. Wikidata Q138029595.
