= 85th Volunteer Training Regiment "Verona" =

Active Italian Army training unit

- 85° Reggimento Addestramento Volontari "Verona"
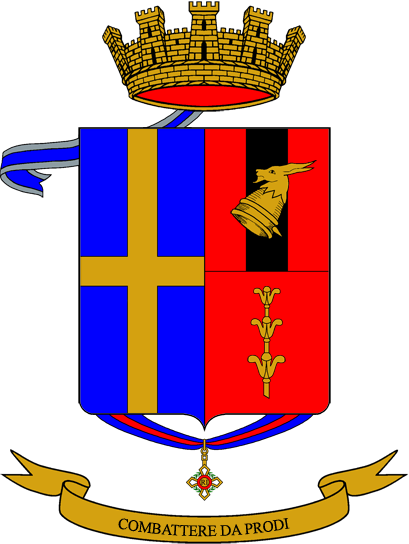
- Regimental coat of arms
- Active: 1 Nov. 1884 – 25 Dec. 1917; 1 June 1918 – Feb. 1941; 4 Sept. 1941 – 25 July 1942; 1 Oct. 1975 – 30 April 1991; 25 Sept. 1991 – today
- Country: Italy
- Branch: Italian Army
- Part of: Infantry School
- Garrison/HQ: Verona
- Motto: "Combattere da prodi"
- Anniversaries: 2 July 1916 – Battle of Monte Pasubio
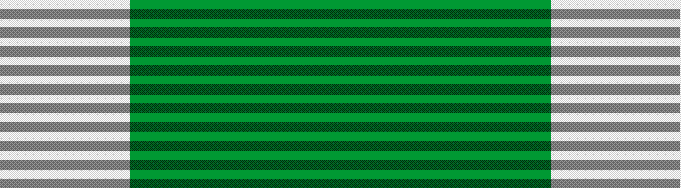
- Decorations: 1× Military Order of Italy; 1× Silver Medal of Military Valor; 1× Silver Medal of Merit

Insignia
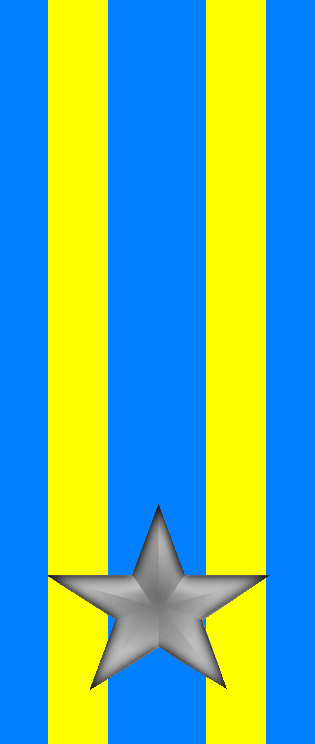
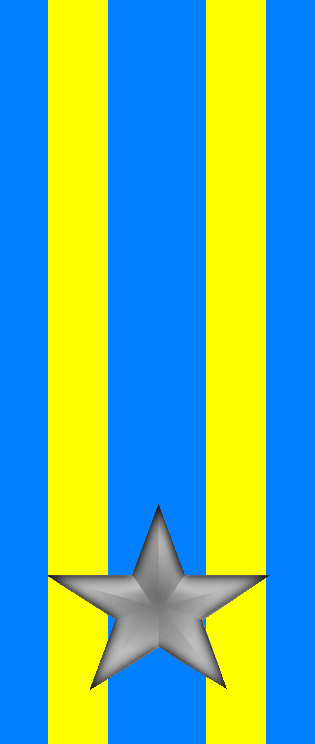
- Regimental gorget patches

The 85th Volunteer Training Regiment "Verona" (Italian: 85° Reggimento Addestramento Volontari "Verona") is an active unit of the Italian Army based in Verona in Veneto. The regiment is named for the city of Verona and was part of the Italian Army's infantry arm until it became a training unit and was redesignated as a "multi-arms unit" in 2004.

The regiment was one of sixteen infantry regiments formed on 1 November 1884. During World War I the regiment fought on the Italian front and for a short time in Albania. Destroyed during the Battle of Caporetto in 1917 the regiment was reformed in June 1918 and sent to the Macedonian front. During World War II the regiment was assigned to the 60th Infantry Division "Sabratha", which was based in Italian Libya. In February 1941 the division and regiment were destroyed in the Battle of Beda Fomm. Both were reformed in September 1941 and participated in the Western Desert Campaign until both were once more destroyed in July 1942 in the First Battle of El Alamein. In 1975 the regiment was reformed as battalion sized mechanized unit. In 1991 the regiment was reformed as a training unit and has been active since then.

== History ==
=== Formation ===
On 1 November 1884 the 85th Infantry Regiment (Brigade "Verona") was formed in Tortona with companies ceded by the 13rd Infantry Regiment (Brigade "Pinerolo"), 27th Infantry Regiment (Brigade "Pavia"), 31st Infantry Regiment (Brigade "Siena"), 32nd Infantry Regiment (Brigade "Siena"), and 47th Infantry Regiment (Brigade "Ferrara"). On the same day the 86th Infantry Regiment (Brigade "Verona") was formed in Novi Ligure with companies ceded by the 14th Infantry Regiment (Brigade "Pinerolo"), 28th Infantry Regiment (Brigade "Pavia"), 48th Infantry Regiment (Brigade "Ferrara"), and by the 69th Infantry Regiment and 70th Infantry Regiment of the Brigade "Ancona". Both regiments consisted of a staff and three battalions, with four companies per battalion. Together the two regiments formed the Brigade "Verona".

In 1887 the regiment's 4th Company participated in the Italo-Ethiopian War of 1887–1889. In 1895–96 the regiment provided seven officers and 136 enlisted for units deployed to Italian Eritrea for the First Italo-Ethiopian War. In December 1908, the regiment was deployed to the area of the Strait of Messina for the recovery efforts after the 1908 Messina earthquake. For its service the regiment was awarded a Silver Medal of Merit, which was affixed to the regiment's flag. In 1911–12 the regiment provided 16 officers and 1,420 enlisted to augment units fighting in the Italo-Turkish War.

=== World War I ===
At the outbreak of World War I, the Brigade "Verona" formed, together with the Brigade "Aosta" and the 22nd Field Artillery Regiment, the 23rd Division. At the time the 85th Infantry Regiment consisted of three battalions, each of which fielded four fusilier companies and one machine gun section. On 1 January 1915 the regimental depot of the 85th Infantry Regiment in Trapani formed the 144th Infantry Regiment (Brigade "Trapani") and on 5 March of the same year the depot formed the command of the Brigade "Trapani". After Italy's entry into the war on 23 May 1915 the Brigade "Verona" was deployed to the Italian front: in 1915 the brigade operated against Austro-Hungarian forces on the Karst Plateau and in October 1915 the brigade fought in the Third Battle of the Isonzo on Monte San Michele. On Monte San Michele the brigade lost 74 officers and 2,887 enlisted or about half of it strength.

In November 1915 the brigade was transferred to Albania, where it assembled at Vlorë on 7 December. The brigade then took up positions on the Vjosa river upstream from the confluence with the Shushicë. In May 1916 the brigade was recalled to Italy and sent to the Vallarsa valley to reinforce the Italian lines during the Battle of Asiago. On 31 May 1916 the brigade deployed to Monte Pasubio, where during June and July the brigade repeatedly defeat Austro-Hungarian attacks. For their conduct on Monte Pasubio the two regiments of the Brigade "Verona" were both awarded a Silver Medal of Military Valor.

In January 1917 the depot of the 85th Infantry Regiment formed the 248th Infantry Regiment (Brigade "Girgenti"). In May 1917 the brigade was back on the Karst plateau and fought in the Tenth Battle of the Isonzo on Monte Ermada. In October 1917 the regiment fought in the Battle of Caporetto and was forced to retreat to the Piave river. The brigade was then deployed on Col del Rosso, where it was attacked and nearly overrun by Austro-Hungarian forces on 23 December. On 25 December 1917 the brigade and its regiments were disbanded in Marostica due to the losses the brigade had suffered.

On 1 June 1918 the brigade and its two regiments were reformed in Albania and once more deployed along the Vjosa river. On 5 July 1918 the brigade attacked Austro-Hungarian positions South of Fier, which was taken on 9 July. Afterwards the brigade took up defensive positions near Mallakastër. After the end of the war the brigade remained in Albania until 1920.

=== Interwar years ===
On 18 November 1926 the brigade command and the 86th Infantry Regiment were disbanded, while the 85th Infantry Regiment, now renamed 85th Infantry Regiment "Verona", was assigned the next day to the XXVIII Infantry Brigade, which was the infantry component of the 28th Territorial Division of Palermo.

In 1934, the 28th Territorial Division of Palermo changed its name to 28th Infantry Division "Vespri". A name change that also extended to the division's infantry brigade. In 1935–36 the regiment provided nine officers and 500 enlisted for the units deployed for the Second Italo-Ethiopian War. On 20 May 1937 the 85th Infantry Regiment "Verona" was transferred to the 60th Infantry Division "Sabratha", which had been formed in Gharyan in Libya on 9 May 1937. The 85th Verona left Trapani and moved to the area of Tripoli in Libya, where the regiment arrived in September 1937. The same year the 86th Infantry Regiment "Verona" was reformed and sent to Libya to join the Sabratha. In 1939 the two infantry regiment were renamed 85th Infantry Regiment "Sabratha", respectively 86th Infantry Regiment "Sabratha".

=== World War II ===
At the outbreak of World War II the regiment consisted of a command, a command company, three fusilier battalions, a support weapons battery equipped with 65/17 infantry support guns, and a mortar company equipped with 81mm Mod. 35 mortars.

On 9 December 1940 the British Western Desert Force commenced Operation Compass, which quickly resulted in the annihilation of most Italian divisions that had participated in the invasion of Egypt. The Sabratha division was rushed East as reinforcement for the Italian 10th Army. In January 1941 the division fought delaying actions against British forces in the Derna-Al Qubbah area. On 6–7 February 1941 the division was destroyed during the Battle of Beda Fomm.

The remnants of the Sabratha retreated to Al Khums in Western Libya, where the survivors of the division formed in June 1941 the Infantry Regiment "Sabratha", which consisted of one battalion formed with the remaining infantry of the 85th Infantry Regiment "Sabratha" and one battalion with the infantry remnants of the 86th Infantry Regiment "Sabratha". The regiment also included the mortar companies of both regiments, two support weapons batteries with 65/17 infantry support guns, and two cannons companies with 47/32 anti-tank guns.

On 4 September 1941 the division was and its regiments were reformed. The division then participated in all the battles of the Western Desert Campaign: in fall 1941 in the Siege of Tobruk, in May and June 1942 in the Battle of Gazala, in June 1942 in the capture of Tobruk and the Battle of Mersa Matruh. In July 1942 the Sabratha was destroyed for a second time in the First Battle of El Alamein. On 25 July 1942 the 85th Infantry Regiment "Sabratha" was disbanded and the remaining personnel and materiel assigned to the 61st Infantry Regiment "Trento" of the 102nd Motorized Division "Trento".

=== Cold War ===
During the 1975 army reform the Italian Army disbanded the regimental level and newly independent battalions were granted for the first time their own flags. On 30 September 1975 the 67th Infantry Regiment "Legnano" was disbanded and the next day the regiment's I Battalion in Montorio Veronese was renamed 85th Mechanized Infantry Battalion "Verona" and assigned the flag and traditions of the 85th Infantry Regiment "Verona". The battalion was assigned to the Mechanized Brigade "Brescia" and consisted of a command, a command and services company, three mechanized companies with M113 armored personnel carriers, and a heavy mortar company with M106 mortar carriers with 120mm Mod. 63 mortars. At the time the battalion fielded 896 men (45 officers, 100 non-commissioned officers, and 751 soldiers).

=== Recent times ===
With the end of the Cold War the Italian Army reduced its forces and on 30 November 1989 the battalion was placed in reserve status. On 30 April 1991 the battalion was disbanded and the flag of the 85th Infantry Regiment "Verona" transferred to the Shrine of the Flags in the Vittoriano in Rome. On 24 September 1991, the 30th Infantry Battalion "Pisa" in Montorio Veronese was disbanded and the next day the disbanded battalion's personnel used to reform the 85th Infantry Regiment "Verona". The regiment assigned to the Northeastern Military Region as the region's recruits training unit. In 1992 the regiment was renamed 85th Regiment "Verona" and assigned to the Anti-aircraft Artillery Command. On 8 October 2004 the regiment joined the newly formed Training Units Grouping and was renamed 85th Volunteer Training Regiment "Verona".

== Organization ==
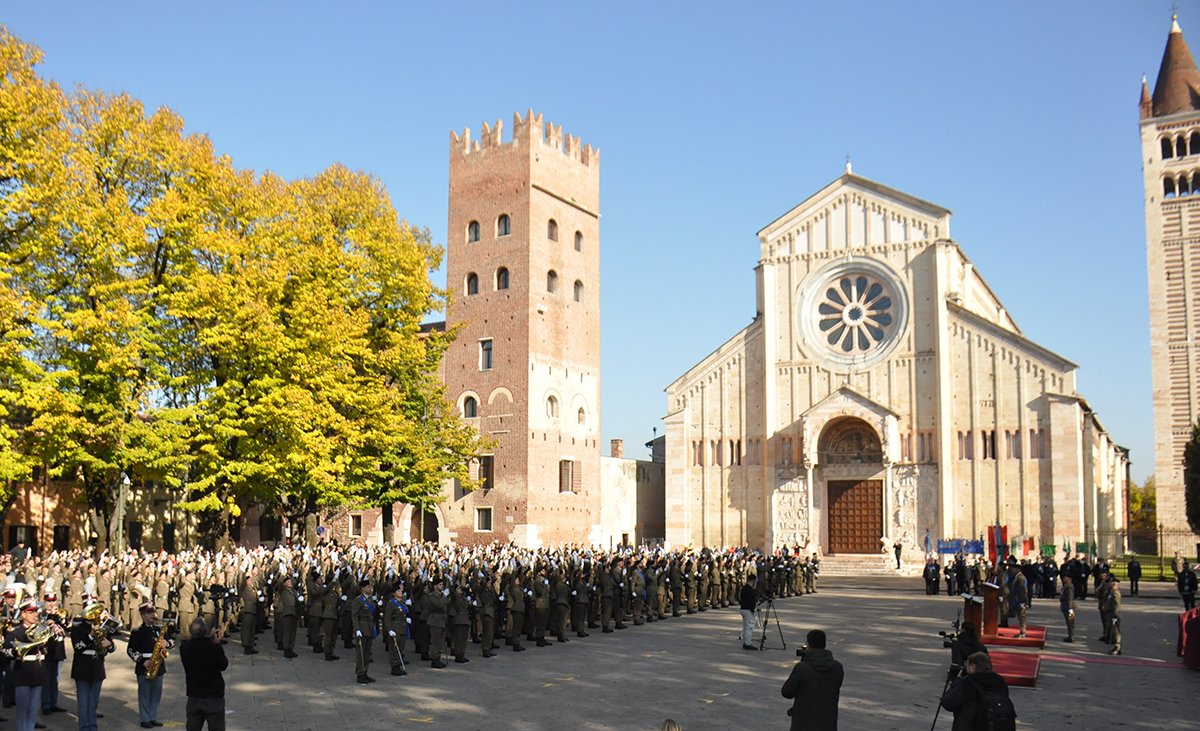
85th Volunteer Training Regiment "Verona" recruits swear allegiance to the Italian Republic in front of the Basilica of San Zeno in Verona

As of 2024 the 85th Volunteer Training Regiment "Verona" is organized as follows:

- 85th Volunteer Training Regiment "Verona", in Verona
  - Command and Logistic Support Company
  - 1st Training Battalion
    - 1st Company
    - 2nd Company
    - 3rd Company
