= Albert von Berrer =

German general

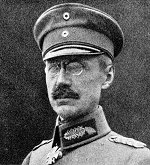
- Born: 8 September 1857; Unterkochen, Kingdom of Württemberg
- Died: 28 October 1917 (aged 60); San Gottardo, Kingdom of Italy
- Military career
- Allegiance: German Empire
- Branch: Imperial German Army
- Service years: 1874–1917
- Rank: Generalleutnant (Lieutenant General)
- Units: 31st Infantry Division; 51st Corps
- Conflicts: World War I
- Awards: Pour le Mérite

Albert von Berrer (8 September 1857 – 28 October 1917) was a Generalleutnant of Imperial German Army who was involved in World War I. He was killed in action in late 1917.

== Life ==
Albert von Berrer was born on 8 September 1857 in the Kingdom of Württemberg. He entered the 119th (1st Württemberg) Infantry Regiment in 1874, becoming a second lieutenant in 1876. During World war I, Berrer was the commander of 31st Infantry Division. His division belonged to Fritz von Below's XXI Corps and the 5th Army. He later was deployed on the Eastern Front. Eventually Berrer's corps was sent to the Italian Front as a part of Otto von Below's 14th Army. Berrer's unit pushed deep into the front and Berrer was awarded the Pour le Mérite on 27 August 1917. However, on 28 October 1917, Berrer was killed in action at San Gottardo when his staff car exceeded the front line. Shortly after entering the town San Gottardo in Italy, which seemed to be deserted, the car found itself being blocked by Italian soldiers. Shocked, the driver stopped the car, after which the Italian soldiers fired. Berrer was killed by a shot to the head.

Military offices
Preceded by New Formation	Commander, 51st Corps; 27 August 1916 - 28 October 1917	Succeeded by Generalleutnant Eberhard von Hofacker
