= 20th (2nd Württemberg) Uhlans "King William I" =

Cavalry regiment of the Army of Württemberg

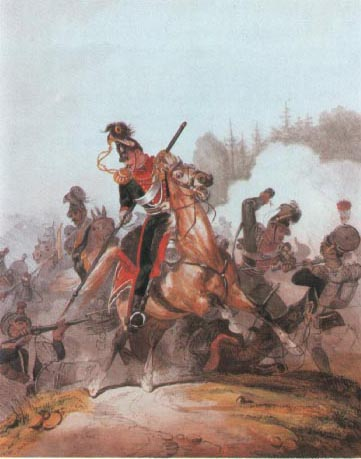
The regiment by H. A. Eckert, 1835

The 20th (2nd Württemberg) Uhlans "King William I" (Ulanen-Regiment "König Wilhelm I." (2. Württembergisches) Nr. 20) was a cavalry regiment of the Army of Württemberg. The regiment was formed as dragoons in 1809, and was reorganized as uhlans in 1871. The regiment took part in Napoleon's Russian campaign, the Austro-Prussian War and Franco-Prussian War. In World War I it served as divisional cavalry for the 26th (1st Württemberg) Division. Formally disbanded on May 1, 1919, the regiment existed until September 1920 as Abwicklungsstelle. The 1st Squadron/18th Horse bore the regiment's tradition in the new Reichsheer.

This particular regiment was also known as the "Queen's Guard", as the Queen was the "Colonel-In-Chief" of the regiment.

== Equipment ==
Uhlan regiments were used in close attack or pursuit of an enemy. Lances adorned with banners and streamers were used when routing the enemy from the field. The troopers were also typically issued with a single action carbine rifle, a pistol and a dress sabre (which had the regiment, unit number and insignia engraved into the blade). On release from service, an officer was responsible for his own clothing for the trip home. If he had brought his own clothing in, he was expected to wear it out.

Equipment and saddlery belonged to the army, but could be purchased.

== History ==
As early as 1704, the Prussians were using cavalry troops armed with lances. In 1745, a unit known as "Bosniaken" was linked with the "Totenkopf-Husaren-Regiment" and wore a costume which derived from Bosnian and Polish national costume. By 1806, the Prussian Army still retained units with strong Polish and Bosnian links. These were the "Towarczys" Regiment and a self-standing "Towarczy" Battalion, both of which were armed primarily with the lance, and were used for scouting and foraging duties for which the Uhlans became justly famous. These troops were used in East Prussia and the bordering Polish and Austrian-Hungarian states and had a distinctly Tartar-Slav appearance.

Saxony also had its Ulanen-pulks in the 18th. century, and in Bavaria a lancer regiment was raised in 1813, dressed in the ‘Österreichischer’ style.

The Prussian Uhlan regiment, raised in 1806/7 from the former ‘Towarczys", had a strength of eight squadrons but was later divided to form two separate regiments of four squadrons each. By 1819, the establishment of Uhlan Regiments had been increased to two Guard Regiments and eight line regiments distinguished by facing colours and different coloured buttons.

The Garde-Regiments stemmed from the Leib-Ulanen-Eskadron, which was re-titled the Garde-Ulanen-Eskadron in 1810; a second Garde-Ulanen-Regiment was raised in 1819. The line regiments were raised from the Freiwillige and National cavalry regiments of 1813–1815 Freedom War, the Freikorps Lützow, Freikorps Hellwig and the Russo-German Legion. In 1860, besides a 3rd Garde-Regiment, a further four line regiments were formed. In 1856, the third line regiment received the title Ulanen-Regiment König Alexander II von Russland. In 1866, Regiments 13-16 were formed. In 1884, the "West Preussen Ulanen Regiment No. 1" was titled "Ulanen-Regiment Konig Alexander Ill von Russland (West Preussisches) No. 1". In 1889, Kaiser Wilhelm II was declared the Regimental Chief of the "1st Hannoverschen Ulanen-Regiment No. 13" which, on the same day, was re-titled "Konigs-Ulanen-Regiment (1 Hannoversches) No. 13". In 1902, the "Ulanen-Regiment Hennings von Treffenfeld (Altmarkisches) No. 16", was granted the distinction of wearing the cypher of King George of Saxony, and in the next year the "Thüringische-Ulanen-Regiment No. 6", was granted similar-distinction in respect of King Christian IX of Denmark.

By 1871, the Württemberg cavalry had been re-organized as two Dragoon and two Uhlan Regiments. The Uhlans became the 19th and 20th Uhlan Regiments in the national numbered sequence. The Royal Armies of both Saxony and Württemberg retained their own War Ministries and Headquarters Staffs and Establishments and were bracketed in the 1st and 2nd Royal Saxon Army Corps (XII and XIX of the National Army) and the Royal Württemberg Army Corps (XIII of the National Army). These armies retained many characteristics of their old uniforms. The 1st and 2nd Saxon Uhlans, which were both raised in 1867, were given the numbers 17 and 18 in the national numbered sequence in 1871. A further Saxon Regiment was raised in 1905 and took the number 21.

The Royal Bavarian Army remained completely autonomous under the command of its King and with its own Headquarters Staff and Establishments. It was formed into I, II and III Bavarian Army Corps and retained its old uniforms, but accepted some characteristics of the Prussian uniform and adapted these to their own needs. The 1st and 2nd Bavarian Uhlan Regiments were raised on 21 December 1863 - they did not figure in the numbered sequence of the national army.

== See also ==
- List of Imperial German cavalry regiments
