= 60th Infantry Division "Sabratha" =

Infantry division of the Royal Italian Army during World War II

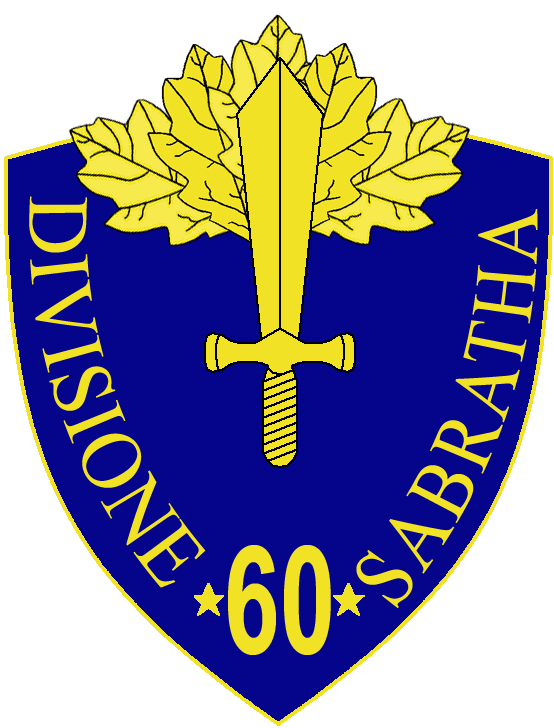
- 60th Infantry Division "Sabratha" insignia
- Active: 1937 - 1942
- Country: Kingdom of Italy
- Branch: Royal Italian Army
- Type: Infantry
- Size: Division
- Garrison/HQ: Gharyan
- Engagements: World War II; North African Campaign

Commanders
- Notable commanders: General Giuseppe Tellera; General Guido Della Bona; Colonel Riccardo De Cosa (interim); General Mario Soldarelli

Insignia
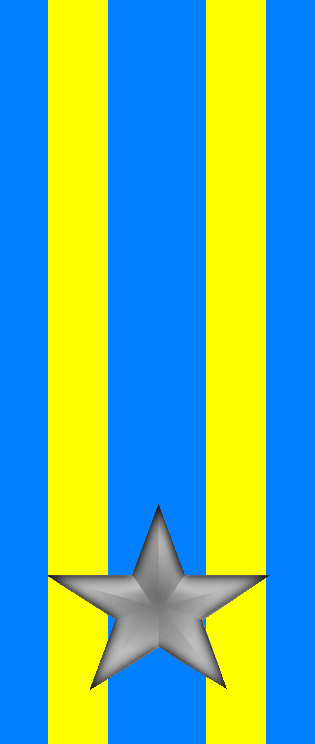
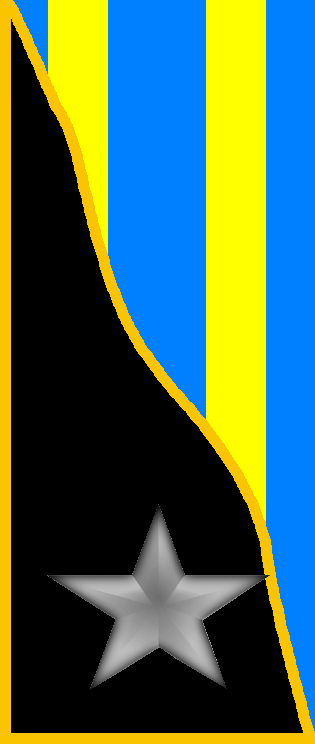
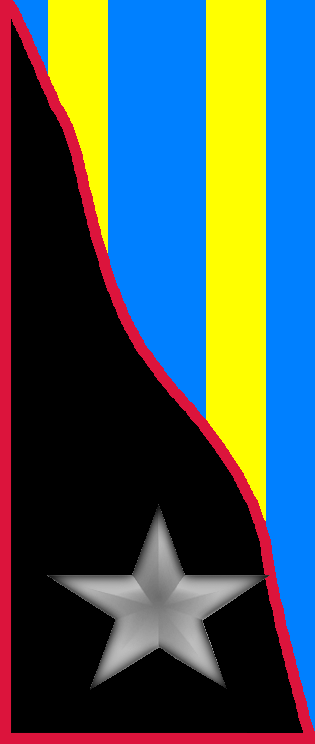
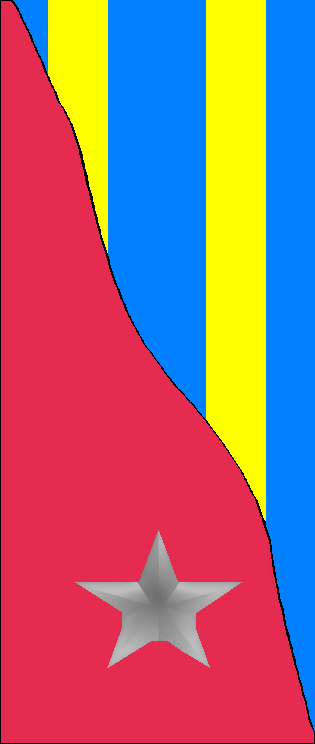
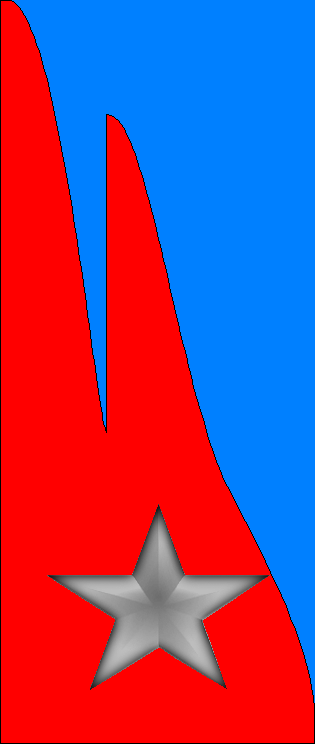
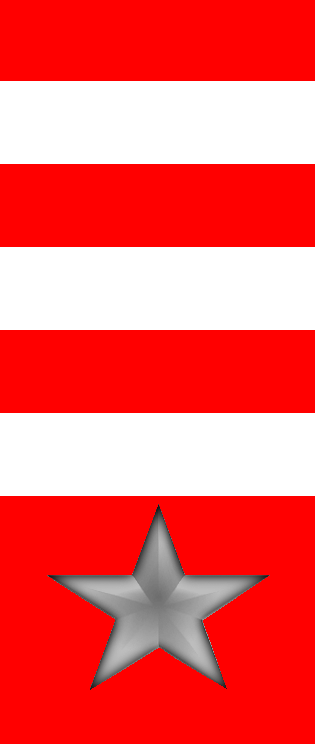
- Identification symbol: Sabratha Division gorget patches

The 60th Infantry Division "Sabratha" (Italian: 60ª Divisione di fanteria "Sabratha") was an infantry division of the Royal Italian Army during World War II. The Sabratha was raised in May 1937, in Gharyan in Italian Libya and named after the nearby ancient Roman city of Sabratha. The division's regimental depots were in mainland Italy in Campania and shared with the 25th Infantry Division "Bologna", with both divisions recruiting their troops from and training them there. The division was destroyed on 25 July 1942 during the First Battle of El Alamein in Egypt and its remnants used to fill up the depleted ranks of the 102nd Motorized Division "Trento". The Sabratha was classified as an auto-transportable division, meaning it had some motorized transport, but not enough to move the entire division at once.

== History ==
The division's lineage begins with the Brigade "Verona" established on 2 June 1883 with the 85th and 86th infantry regiments. The brigade fought on the Italian front in World War I and together with its regiments was disbanded on 25 December 1917 after having been destroyed in the Battle of Caporetto.

The brigade and its two regiments were raised again on 1 June 1918 in Albania and fought on the Macedonian front. On 18 November 1926 the brigade command and the 86th Infantry Regiment were disbanded, while the 85th Infantry Regiment "Verona" was transferred to the XXVIII Infantry Brigade. On 9 May 1937 the 60th Infantry Division "Sabratha" was activated in Gharyan in Libya and in September of the same year the 85th Infantry Regiment "Verona" left the 28th Infantry Division "Vespri" in Sicily and was transferred to Libya to join the Sabratha. The same year the 86th Infantry Regiment "Verona" and the 42nd Artillery Regiment were reactivated in Italy and then transferred to Libya to join the Sabratha.

The division's major units were:

- 60th Infantry Division "Sabratha", in Gharyan
  - 85th Infantry Regiment "Verona", in Yafran
  - 86th Infantry Regiment "Verona", in Zawiya
  - 42nd Artillery Regiment, in Gharyan

In 1939 the division's three regiments were renamed "Sabratha".

=== World War II ===
During the Italian invasion of France from 10 to 25 June 1940 the Sabratha was deployed along the French Tunisian-Libyan border. After the signing of the Franco-Italian Armistice signed on 24 June 1940 the Sabratha returned to its base in Gharyan south of Tripoli.

When the British Western Desert Force started to crush the Italian 10th Army during Operation Compass in late 1940 the Sabratha deployed to defensive positions south of Derna. In late January 1941 the division fought a series of delaying battles against superior British forces, which were advancing through the Derna-Al Qubbah region. On 30 January 1941, as the danger of encirclement became apparent, the Sabratha division retreated through Sulunţah, Marj and Benghazi, and arrived in Qaminis on 5 February 1941. The already heavily degraded division was almost completely destroyed during the Battle of Beda Fomm on 6–7 February 1941. Afterwards the remnants of the Sabratha retreated on the Ajdabiya-Sirte route, and were then assigned for coastal defense in the Al Khums region in Western Libya. In May 1941 the replenished division was ordered to defensive positions inland, to cover the Gharyan-Nalut front, with most units covering the approach to Gharyan south of Tripli. By September 1941 the reformed Sabratha returned to the front in the east near Tobruk.

After the return to the front the Sabratha met with mixed fortune during continuing Western Desert campaign. Initially, the Sabratha was covering the Sallum area in Egypt, but soon the British Operation Crusader began to overrun the Axis' positions and the division was forced into another arduous retreat through Minqār ‘Ayn al Ghazālah, Derna, Al Qubbah and Mechili. On 23 December 1941 the division made a stand on the coastal road at Brega blocking further Allied advances.

On 23 January 1942 the Sabratha started to advance again, partially enveloping Ajdabiya from the north-east. In May 1942 during the Battle of Gazala the Sabratha played an important role in the capture of 6,000 prisoners at Gazala after the 101st Motorized Division "Trieste" and 15th Panzer Division had defeated the British 2nd and 4th Armoured Brigades. By 20 June 1942 the division was located east of Acroma. After the Fall of Tobruk on 21 June 1942, the Sabratha accelerated its movement, passing in quick succession through Bardia, Sollum and Sidi Barrani, reaching the vicinity of El Alamein on 1 July 1942.

Before the positions to the West of El Alamein were adequately fortified, the Australian 26th Brigade attacked. On 10 July 1942 the Sabratha was routed under a heavy artillery barrage, with over 1,500 Italians made prisoner. The Italians reacted vigorously and a battalion of the 102nd Motorized Division "Trento" was ordered to retake the position. While the Italian counterattack failed to achieve its objective, it bought time to allow the Italian XXI Army Corps to rush in a battalion of the 101st Motorized Division "Trieste", the III Tank Squadrons Group of the "Regiment "Lancieri di Novara" and Major Gabriele Verri's XI Tank Battalion to stabilize the sector and stop the Australian advance. In the meantime the Sabratha had recovered from the initial blow and Colonel Angelozzi's I Battalion/ 85th Infantry Regiment "Sabratha" launched a counterattack against Tell-el-Eisa on 14 July supported by Italian tanks. The attack succeeded to pierce the enemy line on the Tell-el-Eisa Ridge. Under fierce pressure the Australian troops were forced to withdraw from their forward positions, but their main defenses remained largely intact. On 25 July 1942 the survivors of Sabratha were incorporated into the 61st Infantry Regiment "Sicilia" of the Trento division and the Sabratha was officially declared dissolved on 13 August 1942.

== Organization ==
=== Auto-transportable North-African-type 40 ===
60th Infantry Division "Sabratha" organization in 1940

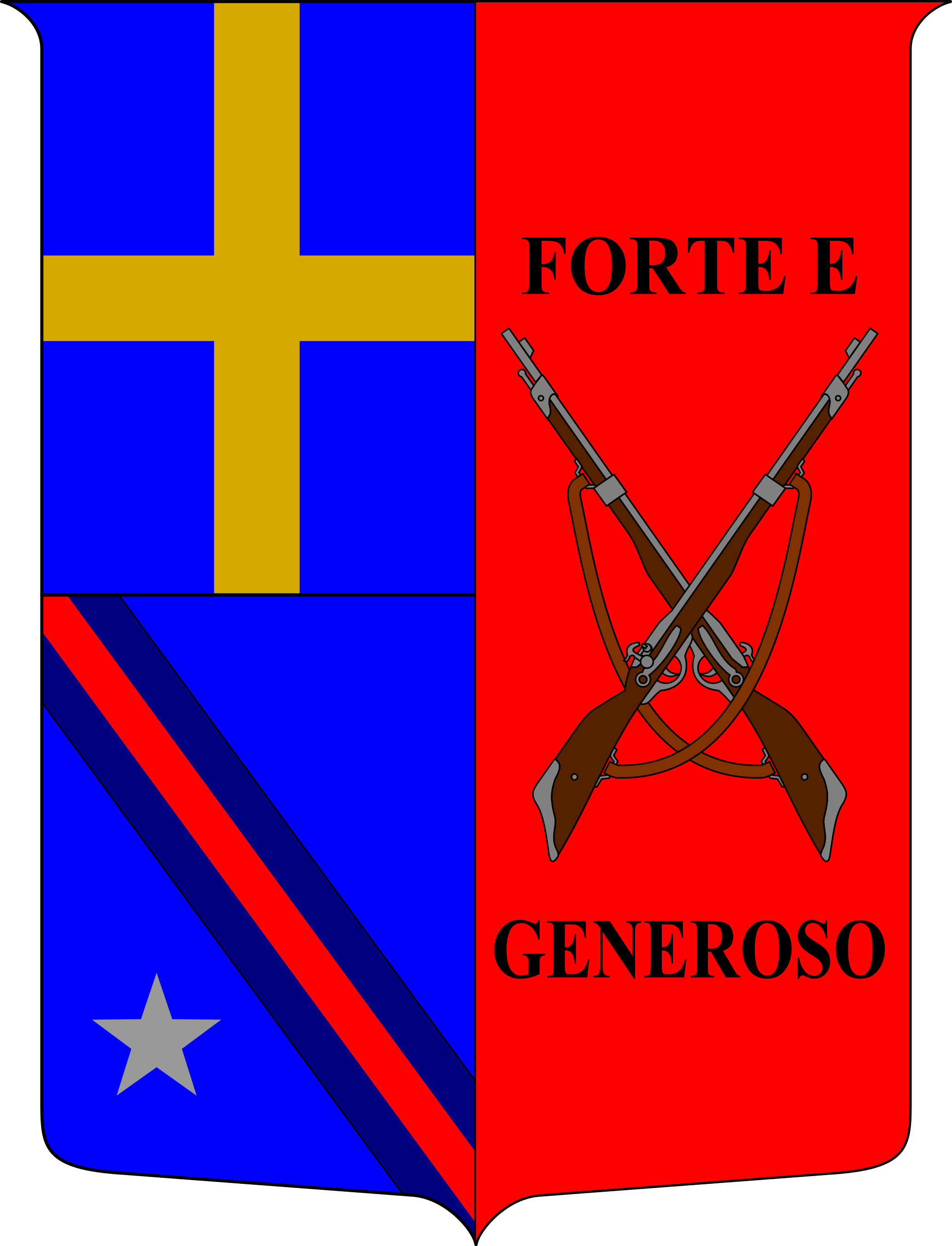
Coat of Arms of the 86th Infantry Regiment "Verona", 1939

- 60th Infantry Division "Sabratha", in Gharyan
  - Headquarters
    - Command Company
    - 105th Carabinieri Section
    - 260th Field Post Office
    - 60th Infantry Division Command Transport Squad
  - 85th Infantry Regiment "Sabratha", (Note: Named 85th Infantry Regiment "Verona" until 1939 when the army reorganized its divisions as binary divisions and divisional infantry regiments took the name of the division.) in Yafran
    - Command Company
    - 3 × Fusilier battalions
      - Command Company, 3 × Fusilier companies, 1 × Weapons Company (Breda M37 heavy machine guns and 45mm mod. 35 mortars)
    - Support Weapons Battery (65/17 mod. 13 infantry support guns)
    - Mortar Company (81mm mod. 35 mortars)
  - 86th Infantry Regiment "Sabratha", (Note: Named 86th Infantry Regiment "Verona" until 1939 when the army reorganized its divisions as binary divisions and divisional infantry regiments took the name of the division.) in Zawiya
    - Command Company
    - 3 × Fusilier battalions
      - Command Company, 3 × Fusilier companies, 1 × Weapons Company (Breda M37 heavy machine guns and 45mm mod. 35 mortars)
    - Support Weapons Battery (65/17 mod. 13 infantry support guns)
    - Mortar Company (81mm mod. 35 mortars)
  - 42nd Artillery Regiment "Sabratha", in Gharyan
    - Command Unit
    - I Group (75/27 mod. 06 field guns; formed by the depot of the 4th Artillery Regiment "Carnaro")
    - II Group (75/27 mod. 06 field guns; formed by the depot of the 6th Artillery Regiment "Isonzo")
    - III Group (75/27 mod. 06 field guns; formed by the depot of the 15th Artillery Regiment "Montenero", re-equipped with 100/17 mod. 14 howitzers)
    - 60th Anti-aircraft Battery (20/65 mod. 35 anti-aircraft guns)
    - 260th Anti-aircraft Battery (20/65 mod. 35 anti-aircraft guns)
    - Ammunition and Supply Unit
  - 3rd Fast Artillery Regiment "Principe Amedeo Duca d'Aosta" (attached to the division from March 1942)
    - Command Unit
    - I Group (100/17 mod. 14 howitzers; joined the regiment in North Africa)
    - II Group (100/17 mod. 14 howitzers; joined the regiment in North Africa)
    - III Group (75/27 mod. 06 field guns)
    - IV Group (75/27 mod. 06 field guns)
    - 2 × Anti-aircraft batteries (20/65 mod. 35 anti-aircraft guns)
    - Ammunition and Supply Unit
  - LX Tank Battalion L (L3/35 tankettes)
  - LX Machine Gun Battalion (reorganized as Support Weapons Battalion in summer 1941)
  - LX Support Weapons Battalion (formed in summer 1941)
    - Command Company, 1 × Anti-tank Company (47/32 mod. 35 anti-tank guns), 1 × Mortar Company (81mm mod. 35 mortars), 1 × Anti-aircraft Battery (20/65 mod. 35 anti-aircraft guns)
  - LX Replacements Battalion
  - LX Mixed Engineer Battalion
    - 60th Telegraph and Radio Operators Company
    - 1 × Engineer Company
    - 1 × Searchlight Section
  - 60th Bersaglieri Motorcyclists Company
  - 60th Anti-tank Company (47/32 mod. 35 anti-tank guns)
  - 11th Medical Section
    - 2 × Field hospitals
    - 1 × Surgical unit
  - 20th Supply Section
  - 60th Transport Unit

After the division had been almost completely destroyed during the Battle of Beda Fomm it was rebuilt with the following changes:

- both infantry regiments fielded now two instead of three fusilier battalions
- the destroyed 42nd Artillery Regiment was replaced by the Artillery Grouping "Sabratha" with the CCLXXXII and CCLXXXIV groups, which were both equipped with 75/27 field guns
- the 403rd and 406th anti-aircraft batteries replaced the division's two lost batteries

Attached to the division in 1942:

- Battalion Group "Giovani Fascisti" (until March 1942)
  - Command Company
  - 2 × Volunteer battalions
  - Anti-tank Company (47/32 mod. 35 anti-tank guns)
  - Mortar Company (81mm mod. 35 mortars)
- Navy Battalion "San Marco" (Royal Italian Navy)
- XXXIII Sapper Battalion

Additional forces joined the division temporarily:

- XVIII Anti-aircraft Artillery Group (8.8 cm Flak 37 anti-aircraft guns; formed by the 3rd Anti-aircraft Artillery Regiment)
- XLII Anti-aircraft Artillery Group (7.5cm PL vz.37 anti-aircraft guns; formed by the 2nd Anti-aircraft Artillery Regiment)

=== Auto-transportable North-African-type 42 ===
On 2 January 1942, after the Italian divisions had suffered heavy losses of personnel and equipment during the British Operation Crusader, General Ettore Bastico, the commander of Axis forces in North Africa, ordered that frontline infantry divisions in North Africa, with the exception of the 101st Motorized Division "Trieste", should be reorganized according to the new Auto-transportable North-African-type 42 table of organization and equipment. To reduce the logistic requirements the divisions were reduced to 7,000 men and all their support and transport units were transferred to the direct control to the Italian North African Armed Forces Command. The divisions' infantry regiments were cut down to two battalions of four fusilier companies each and the regiment's heavy weapons, along with the heavy weapons of the divisions' Support Weapons Battalion, were distributed equally among the companies. Each fusilier company then consisted of a command, a fusilier platoon, a machine gun platoon with three Breda M37 heavy machine guns, an anti-tank platoon with three S-18/1000 anti-tank rifles, and an anti-tank platoon with three 47/32 mod. 35 anti-tank guns. Bastico also ordered that, if men and materiel should become available, each regiment was to form a third battalion. Additionally it was planned to strengthen the divisions' artillery regiments by adding a fourth artillery group equipped with 100/17 mod. 16 howitzers and an anti-aircraft/anti-tank group with either German 8.8 cm Flak cannons or Italian 90/53 cannons. However, due to the difficulty of shipping the required materiel across the Mediterranean most infantry and artillery regiments never received the full complement of men and material. Afterwards the 60th Infantry Division "Sabratha" consisted of the following units:

60th Infantry Division "Sabratha" organization in 1942

- 60th Infantry Division "Sabratha"
  - Headquarters
    - Command Company
    - 105th Carabinieri Section
    - 260th Field Post Office
    - 60th Infantry Division Command Transport Squad
  - 85th Infantry Regiment "Sabratha"
    - Command Company
    - 2 × Fusilier battalions
      - Command Company, 4 × Fusilier companies, each consisting of a command, and 1 × Fusilier Platoon, 1 × Machine Gun Platoon (Breda M37 heavy machine guns), 1 × Anti-tank Platoon (S-18/1000 anti-tank rifles), 1 × Anti-tank Platoon (47/32 mod. 35 anti-tank guns)
    - Mortar Company (81mm mod. 35 mortars)
  - 86th Infantry Regiment "Sabratha"
    - Command Company
    - 2 × Fusilier battalions
      - Command Company, 4 × Fusilier companies, each consisting of a command, and 1 × Fusilier Platoon, 1 × Machine Gun Platoon (Breda M37 heavy machine guns), 1 × Anti-tank Platoon (S-18/1000 anti-tank rifles), 1 × Anti-tank Platoon (47/32 mod. 35 anti-tank guns)
    - Mortar Company (81mm mod. 35 mortars)
  - 3rd Fast Artillery Regiment "Principe Amedeo Duca d'Aosta"
    - Command Unit
    - I Group (100/17 mod. 14 howitzers; joined the regiment in North Africa)
    - II Group (100/17 mod. 14 howitzers; joined the regiment in North Africa)
    - III Group (75/27 mod. 06 field guns)
    - IV Group (75/27 mod. 06 field guns)
    - 403rd Anti-aircraft Battery (20/65 mod. 35 anti-aircraft guns)
    - 406th Anti-aircraft Battery (20/65 mod. 35 anti-aircraft guns)
    - Ammunition and Supply Unit
  - LX Mixed Engineer Battalion (transferred to the 136th Armored Division "Giovani Fascisti" after the Second Battle of El Alamein)
    - 60th Telegraph and Radio Operators Company
    - 1 × Engineer Company
    - 1 × Searchlight Section
  - 11th Medical Section
    - 2 × Field hospitals
    - 1 × Surgical unit
  - 20th Supply Section

== Commanding officers ==
The division's commanding officers were:

- Generale di Divisione Giuseppe Tellera (9 May 1937 - 31 August 1938)
- Generale di Divisione Guido Della Bona (1 September 1938 - 2 May 1941)
- Colonel Riccardo De Cosa (acting, 3–25 May 1941)
- Generale di Divisione Mario Soldarelli (26 May 1941 - 13 August 1942)
