= Giovanni Villani (general) =

Italian general (1864–1917)

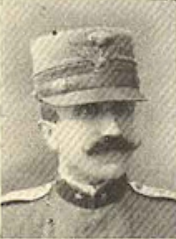
- Born: 5 November 1864; Milan, Kingdom of Italy
- Died: 25 October 1917 (aged 52); Scrutto, Kingdom of Italy
- Military career
- Allegiance: Kingdom of Italy
- Branch: Royal Italian Army
- Rank: Major General
- Commands: 4th Infantry Regiment "Piemonte" "Livorno" Infantry Brigade; 19th Division
- Conflicts: Italo-Ethiopian War of 1887-1889; World War I; White War; Battles of the Isonzo; Battle of Caporetto
- Awards: War Merit Cross; Order of Saints Maurice and Lazarus

Giovanni Villani (Milan, 5 November 1864 – Scrutto, 25 October 1917) was an Italian general during World War I. He committed suicide during the battle of Caporetto.

== Biography ==
=== Early life and career ===
He was born in Milan on 5 November 1864 into a family of Risorgimento traditions, and in 1881 he entered the Royal Military Academy of Infantry and Cavalry in Modena, from which he graduated on 28 July 1883 with the rank of infantry second lieutenant. On 26 September 1886 he was promoted to lieutenant, and after being transferred to the Royal Corps of Colonial Troops in 1887 he participated in the campaign in Eritrea. After returning to Italy, between 1889 and 1891 he attended the courses of the Army War School in Turin. He was later assigned to the 87th Infantry Regiment "Friuli" and then to the Military Academy of Modena; after being promoted to captain on 18 October 1896 he assumed command of a company of the 77th Infantry Regiment "Toscana". From 1906 to 1915 he served in the Alpini corps, initially in the 5th Alpini Regiment of Milan, where he was promoted to major in 1906, and then, after promotion to lieutenant colonel on 30 September 1911, with the 7th Alpini Regiment, stationed in Belluno. Having become colonel on 31 March 1915, towards the end of April he assumed command of the 4th Infantry Regiment "Piemonte" of the "Piemonte" Infantry Brigade, which shortly before the declaration of war on the Austro-Hungarian Empire was deployed in the Fella sector, in Carnia. Although no major fighting took place in that sector of the front, the units of the 4th Regiment distinguished themselves in the small actions in which they participated.

At the beginning of December 1915 he replaced General Ferruccio Trombi (who had been killed in action on 28 October) in command of the "Livorno" Infantry Brigade, deployed on the Karst plateau near Oslavia (Gorizia). On 15 February 1916 the Brigade began the transfer to the Giudicarie sector, and he was promoted to major general on 30 March 1916. He left command of the "Livorno" on 5 July 1917, assuming on 17 July that of the 19th Division, which three days later became part of the XXVII Army Corps, then under the command of General Augusto Vanzo, placed at the front of the Tolmin bridgehead. The Army Corps was heavily engaged during the Eleventh Battle of the Isonzo, but the 19th Division was the only one, of the four that made up the Army Corps, not to carry out any major operations until 24 October, when the Battle of Caporetto began.

=== Caporetto ===
Already on 10 October, General Luigi Cadorna had realized that the positions held in the 19th Division were defended by insufficient forces, and issued a note to the commander of the XXVII Army Corps, General Pietro Badoglio, ordering him to strengthen them, transferring part of the other three divisions on the right bank of the Isonzo. That same day Badoglio held a conference with the four division commanders, ordering them to strengthen and defend the Mount Jeza fortified complex at any cost, and on that same day the engineers of the 19th began to build a new trench on the buttresses of the Jeza. The only of the four divisions that made up the XXVII Army Corps to be positioned on the right bank of the Isonzo, the 19th Division had at its disposal a complex of eighteen understrength battalions (of which six belonged to the "Spezia" Brigade, five to the "Taro" Brigade, six to the "Napoli" Brigade, in addition to the "Val d'Adige" Alpini Battalion) and 188 machine guns. The front held by the Division stretched fourteen kilometres, from the bank of the Isonzo river in the north to Volcanski Ruti in the south. During his three months in command, Villani never took any steps to strengthen and consolidate the defensive lines, leaving his brigade commanders without clear orders. On 21 October he held a war council on the situation with the commanders of the "Spezia" and "Taro" Brigades, intervening confusedly and going so far as to modify the tactical disposition of the forces under his command, causing a certain confusion among his units which had to move to unknown positions instead of staying in the ones they had occupied for many months. On 23 October he carried out a surprise inspection at the tactical command of the "Spezia" Brigade on the Jeza, behaving, according to Captain Deidda, aide-de-camp to the commander of the brigade, in a hysterical and almost rambling way; Deidda later recalled that Villani had cried out "My own staff officers are betraying me!". He wrote to the Supreme Command stating that the enemy would only pass "over his dead body".

At the beginning of the battle, on 24 October, the 19th Division was attacked by five German and Austro-Hungarian divisions, which broke the front in several places, and ceased to exist as an operational unit around five in the afternoon. After burning all papers and documents, Villani abandoned his command post on Mount Jeza, narrowly avoiding being taken prisoner, and arrived in Clabuzzaro (a hamlet of Drenchia) with the few surviving elements of the "Taro" Brigade. On 25 October he continued to retreat along with the remains of his brigades, which had lost, among dead, wounded, and missing, about 10,000 men, eventually transferring the survivors to the 3rd Division of the VII Army Corps. He then descended on foot towards the town of Cividale del Friuli together with a group of his officers; after reachig Scrutto, a hamlet of San Leonardo, exhausted and demoralized, he took leave of his officers with an excuse and entered a field hospital located in a school, where he committed suicide by shooting himself in the head, in order not to be taken prisoner. He had written a final message to the Supreme Command: "The commanders and the troops did their duty to the last". His body was hastily buried in a field due to the arrival of the Austro-Hungarians (who later unsuccessfully looked for his remains in order to give them a proper burial), and there it was found by chance in January 1931 by a farmer who worked in the field which had become his property, and had remained uncultivated until then.
