= Kaiserschützen =

Type of Austro-Hungarian mountain infantry

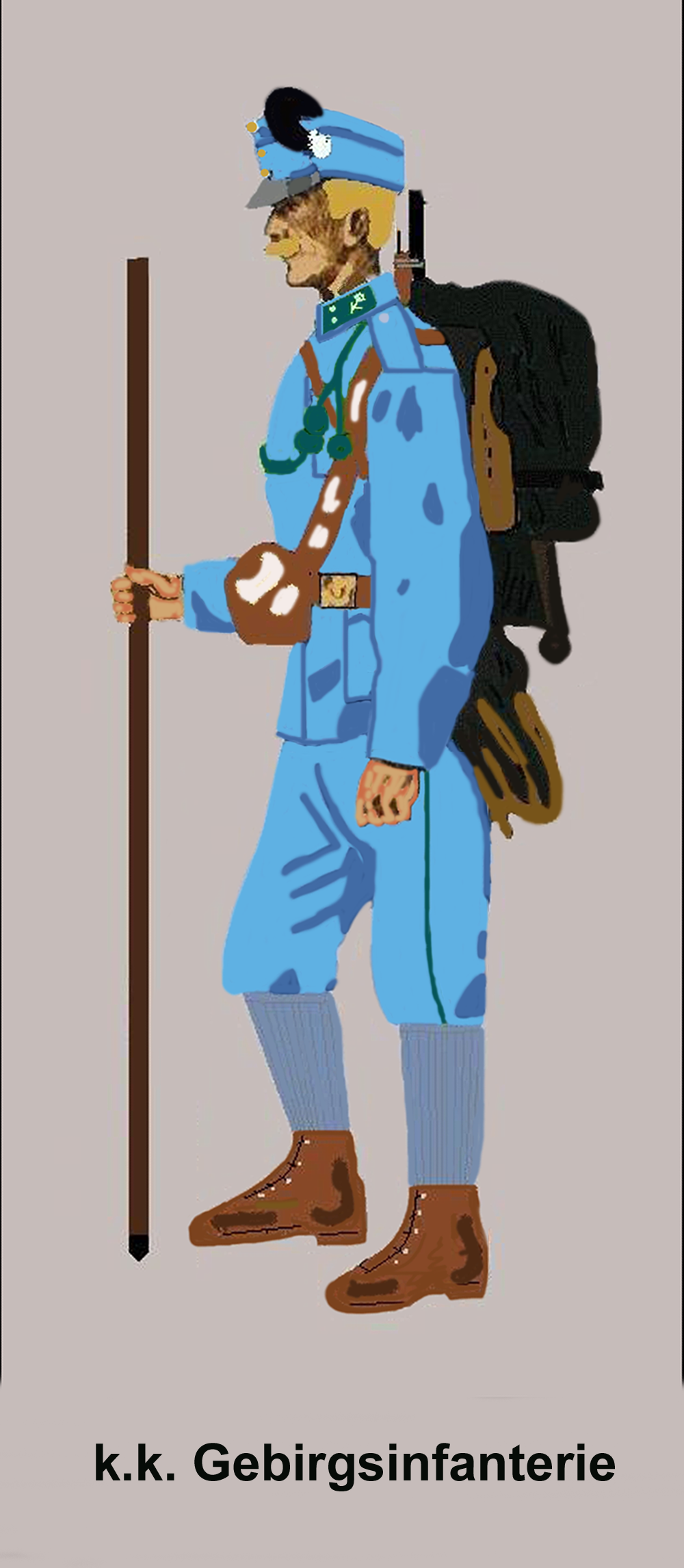
Mountain infantry battle-dress after 1907

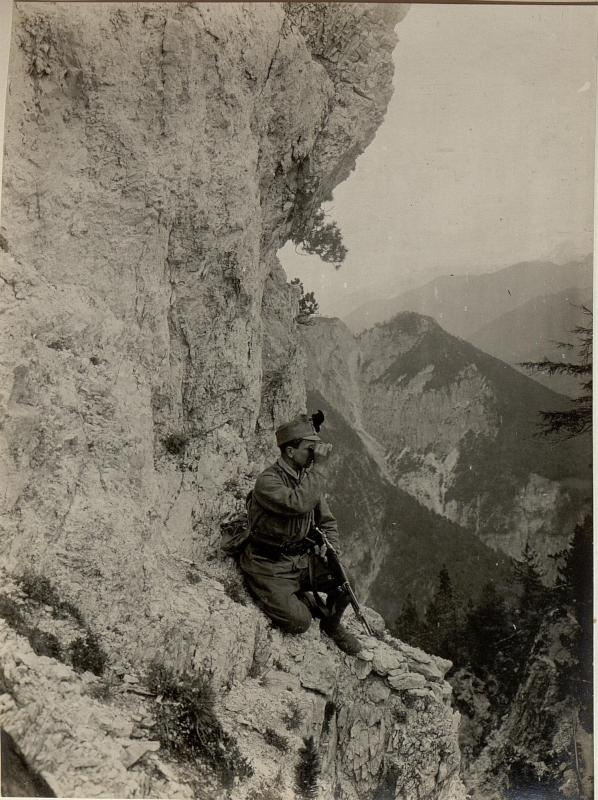
k.k. Landesschützen on Monte Pin

The k.k. Landesschützen (in English, "imperial-royal country [or provincial] riflemen") – from 16 January 1917 Kaiserschützen ("imperial riflemen") – were three regiments of Austro-Hungarian mountain infantry during the kaiserliche und königliche Monarchie (the "imperial and royal monarchy"). As a rule, only Tyrolean and Vorarlberg men were enlisted in the Landesschützen.

== History ==
The Tyrolean Landesschützen ("territorial infantry") were established on 19 December 1870 with ten battalions. Two companies of mounted infantry were added in 1872. In 1906, they were reorganized on the pattern of the Italian Alpini as mountain troops.

Despite being territorial forces, the Kaiserschützen were used in the First World War in many theatres and took heavy losses.

=== Deployments 1914–1918 ===
- Galicia: Lemberg, Gródek, Przemyśl, Pilica, Limanowa Lapanow, Gorlice Tarnów, Carpathia
- Serbia
- Tyrol, Carniola: Monte Cristallo, Monte Piano, Falzarego, Tofana, Col di Lana, Marmolada, amongst others

The Kaiserschützen were deployed principally in opposition to the Italian Alpini. By the date of the armistice, 4 November 1918, the second and third regiments were positioned on Zugna Torta, over Monte Corno, up to Monte Spil. The first regiment were in the Adamello-Presanella Alps.

== Military awards ==
Soldiers of the Kaiserschützen received numerous military decorations:

=== Awards to Officers ===
- 5 awards of the Military Maria Theresa Order
- 4 awards of the Order of the Iron Crown, 2nd Class
- 2 awards of the military merit crosses, 2nd Class
- 29 awards of the Leopold Order
- 166 awards of the Order of the Iron Crown, 3rd Class
- 563 awards of the military merit cross, 3rd Class
- 427 awards of the Signum Laudis in silver
- 1,111 awards of the Signum Laudis in bronze
- 13 awards of the Golden Medal of Honor for officers
- 14 awards of the silver valor medal for officers

=== Awards to Other Ranks ===
- 130 awards of the Golden Medal of Honor
- 2,797 Silver Medal of Valor, 1st Class
- 9,820 awards of the Silver Medal of Valor, 2nd Class
- 13,025 awards of the Bronze Medal of Honor
