= 22nd Reserve Division =

22nd Reserve Division (22. Reserve-Division)
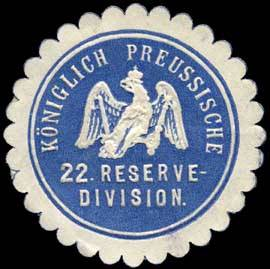
- Active: 1914 – 1919
- Country: Prussia/German Empire
- Branch: Imperial German Army
- Type: Infantry
- Size: Approx. 15,000
- Engagements: World War I: Battle of Mons; Great Retreat; First Battle of the Marne; Battle of Verdun; Battle of the Somme; Passchendaele; German spring offensive; Battle of the Lys

The 22nd Reserve Division (22. Reserve-Division) was a unit of the German Army in World War I. The division was formed on the mobilization of the German Army in August 1914. The division was disbanded during the demobilization of the German Army after World War I.

== Recruitment ==
Although the division was raised primarily in the Province of Prussian Saxony and the Thuringian states (XI Corps District), it was mobilised as part of the IV Reserve Corps. The 32nd Reserve Infantry Regiment was raised in the Reuss principalities. The 71st Reserve Infantry Regiment had one battalion each from Saxe-Meiningen, Prussian Saxony and the Electorate of Hesse. The 82nd Reserve Infantry Regiment had one battalion each from Prussian Saxony, Schwarzburg-Sondershausen, and Saxe-Coburg-Gotha. The 94th Reserve Infantry Regiment was raised in the Grand Duchy of Saxe-Weimar-Eisenach. The 11th Jäger Battalion came from the Electorate of Hesse. Divisional cavalry, artillery and pioneer troops came from Prussian Saxony and the Electorate of Hesse.

== Combat chronicle ==
The 22nd Reserve Division began the war on the Western Front. It fought in the opening campaigns against the Belgian Army and the British Expeditionary Force, including the Battle of Mons, and pursued the Allies during the Great Retreat, culminating in the First Battle of the Marne. After 1st Marne, the division held the line between the Aisne and the Oise until the Autumn of 1915, when it went to the Champagne region. In 1916, it fought in the Battle of Verdun. It then saw action in the later phases of the Battle of the Somme. The division occupied various parts of the line in 1917, and then fought in the Battle of Passchendaele. In 1918, it saw action in the German spring offensive, including the Battle of the Lys. Allied intelligence rated the division as second class.

== Order of battle on mobilization ==
The order of battle of the 22nd Reserve Division on mobilization was as follows:

- 43. Reserve-Infanterie-Brigade
  - Reserve-Infanterie-Regiment Nr. 71
  - Reserve-Infanterie-Regiment Nr. 94
  - Reserve-Jäger-Bataillon Nr. 11
- 44. Reserve-Infanterie-Brigade
  - Reserve-Infanterie-Regiment Nr. 32
  - Reserve-Infanterie-Regiment Nr. 82
- Reserve-Jäger-Regiment zu Pferde Nr. 1
- Reserve-Feldartillerie-Regiment Nr. 22
- 1.Reserve-Kompanie/Magdeburgisches Pionier-Bataillon Nr. 4
- 2.Reserve-Kompanie/Magdeburgisches Pionier-Bataillon Nr. 4

== Order of battle on March 28, 1918 ==
The 22nd Reserve Division was triangularized in March 1915. Over the course of the war, other changes took place, including the formation of artillery and signals commands. The order of battle on March 28, 1918, was as follows:

- 43. Reserve-Infanterie-Brigade
  - Reserve-Infanterie-Regiment Nr. 71
  - Reserve-Infanterie-Regiment Nr. 82
  - Reserve-Infanterie-Regiment Nr. 94
- 2.Eskadron/schweres-Reserve-Reiter-Regiment Nr. 1 (Heavy Cavalry Regiment No. 1)
- Artillerie-Kommandeur 96
  - Reserve-Feldartillerie-Regiment Nr. 22
  - I.Abteilung/Kgl. Bayerisches 2. Fußartillerie-Regiment
- Pionier-Bataillon Nr. 322
- Divisions-Nachrichten-Kommandeur 422
