= 26th Division (German Empire) =

26th Division (26. Division); from August 2, 1914, 26th Infantry Division (26. Infanterie-Division)
- Active: 1871–1919
- Country: Kingdom of Württemberg; German Empire
- Branch: Army
- Type: Infantry (in peacetime included cavalry)
- Size: Approx. 15,000
- Part of: XIII. Army Corps (XIII. Armeekorps)
- Garrison/HQ: Stuttgart
- Engagements: World War I: Battle of the Frontiers, Race to the Sea, Gorlice-Tarnów Offensive, Serbian Campaign (World War I), Battle of the Somme, Arras, Battle of Caporetto, German spring offensive, Hundred Days Offensive

The 26th Division (26. Division), formally the 26th Division (1st Royal Württemberg) (26. Division (1. Königlich Württembergische)), was a unit of the Prussian/German Army. It was headquartered in Stuttgart, the capital of the Kingdom of Württemberg. The division was subordinated in peacetime to the XIII (Royal Württemberg) Corps (XIII. (Königlich Württembergisches) Armeekorps). The division was disbanded in 1919 during the demobilization of the German Army after World War I. The division was raised and recruited in the Kingdom of Württemberg.

== Evolution of the 26th Division ==
The 26th Division was formed in 1817 as Württemberg's 1st Infantry Division. It was merged with Württemberg's 2nd Infantry Division on July 27, 1849, to form Württemberg's Infantry Division and was dissolved in 1868. The division was reestablished after the Franco-Prussian War on December 18, 1871, as the 26th Division (1st Royal Württemberg), taking its new numbering as part of the Prussian Army structure.

== Combat chronicle ==
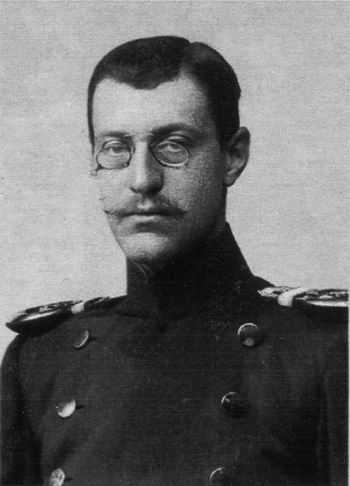
Wilhelm, 2nd Duke of Urach, divisional commander from 1912 to 1917

Although the 26th Division was not formed until 1871, its predecessors saw action in the Austro-Prussian War of 1866 against Prussia and in the Franco-Prussian War of 1870–71 on the side of Prussia against France. The Württemberg Infantry Division saw action in the Main campaign in 1866, suffering a reverse at Tauberbischofsheim. During the Franco-Prussian War, the Württemberg Field Division fought at the battles of Wœrth and Sedan, and then participated in the Siege of Paris and the Battle of Villiers (November 30 and December 2, 1870).

During World War I, the division initially served on the Western Front. In 1914, led by Duke Wilhelm von Urach, it fought in the Battle of the Frontiers and then participated in the Race to the Sea. It was then transferred to the Eastern Front, and fought in the Gorlice-Tarnów Offensive and the invasion of Serbia. It returned to the Western Front and fought in the Battle of the Somme in 1916 and the Battle of Arras in 1917. In late 1917, it was sent to the Italian Front, and fought in the Battle of Caporetto. Returning to the Western Front, the division served in the 1918 German spring offensive and the subsequent Allied counteroffensives, including the Hundred Days Offensive. Allied intelligence rated the division as first class.

== Pre-World War I organization ==
The organization of the 26th Division in 1914, shortly before the outbreak of World War I, was as follows:

- 51. Infanterie-Brigade
  - Grenadier-Regiment Königin Olga (1. Württembergisches) Nr. 119
  - Infanterie-Regiment Kaiser Friedrich, König von Preußen (7. Württembergisches) Nr. 125
- 52. Infanterie-Brigade
  - Infanterie-Regiment Alt-Württemberg (3. Württembergisches) Nr. 121
  - Füsilier-Regiment Kaiser Franz Josef von Österreich, König von Ungarn (4. Württembergisches) Nr. 122
- 26. Kavallerie-Brigade
  - Dragoner-Regiment Königin Olga (1. Württembergisches) Nr. 25
  - Dragoner-Regiment König (2. Württembergisches) Nr. 26
- 26. Feldartillerie-Brigade
  - 2. Württembergisches Feldartillerie-Regiment Nr. 29 Prinz-Regent Luitpold von Bayern
  - 4. Württembergisches Feldartillerie-Regiment Nr. 65

== Order of battle on mobilization ==
On mobilization in August 1914 at the beginning of World War I, most divisional cavalry, including brigade headquarters, was withdrawn to form cavalry divisions or split up among divisions as reconnaissance units. Divisions received engineer companies and other support units from their higher headquarters. The 26th Division was renamed the 26th Infantry Division. Its initial wartime organization was as follows:

- 51. Infanterie-Brigade
  - Grenadier-Regiment Königin Olga (1. Württembergisches) Nr. 119
  - Infanterie-Regiment Kaiser Friedrich, König von Preußen (7. Württembergisches) Nr. 125
- 52. Infanterie-Brigade
  - Infanterie-Regiment Alt-Württemberg (3. Württembergisches) Nr. 121
  - Füsilier-Regiment Kaiser Franz Josef von Österreich, König von Ungarn (4. Württembergisches) Nr. 122
- Ulanen-Regiment König Wilhelm I (2. Württembergisches) Nr. 20
- 26. Feldartillerie-Brigade
  - 2. Württembergisches Feldartillerie-Regiment Nr. 29 Prinz-Regent Luitpold von Bayern
  - 4. Württembergisches Feldartillerie-Regiment Nr. 65
- 1.Kompanie/Württembergisches Pionier-Bataillon Nr. 13

== Late World War I organization ==
Divisions underwent many changes during the war, with regiments moving from division to division, and some being destroyed and rebuilt. During the war, most divisions became triangular – one infantry brigade with three infantry regiments rather than two infantry brigades of two regiments (a "square division"). An artillery commander replaced the artillery brigade headquarters, the cavalry was further reduced, the engineer contingent was increased, and a divisional signals command was created. The 26th Infantry Division's order of battle on March 20, 1918, was as follows:

- 51. Infanterie-Brigade
  - Grenadier-Regiment Königin Olga (1. Württembergisches) Nr. 119
  - Infanterie-Regiment Alt-Württemberg (3. Württembergisches) Nr. 121
  - Infanterie-Regiment Kaiser Friedrich, König von Preußen (7. Württembergisches) Nr. 125
  - Maschinengewehr-Scharfschützen-Abteilung Nr. 40
- 2.Eskadron/Ulanen-Regiment König Karl (1. Württembergisches) Nr. 19
- Artillerie-Kommandeur 58:
  - Feldartillerie-Regiment Prinz-Regent Luitpold von Bayern (2. Württembergisches) Nr. 29
  - II./Niederschlesisches Fußartillerie-Regiment Nr. 5
- Pionier-Bataillon Nr. 143:
  - 1.Kompanie/Württembergisches Pionier-Bataillon Nr. 13
  - 5.Kompanie/Württembergisches Pionier-Bataillon Nr. 13
  - Minenwerfer-Kompanie Nr. 26
- Divisions-Nachrichten-Kommandeur 26

== See also ==
- 26th Infantry Division (Wehrmacht) for the eponymous German division in World War II
