= Sack of Dinant =

1914 executions and looting in Belgium

The Sacking of Dinant
- Part of the Rape of Belgium in World War I
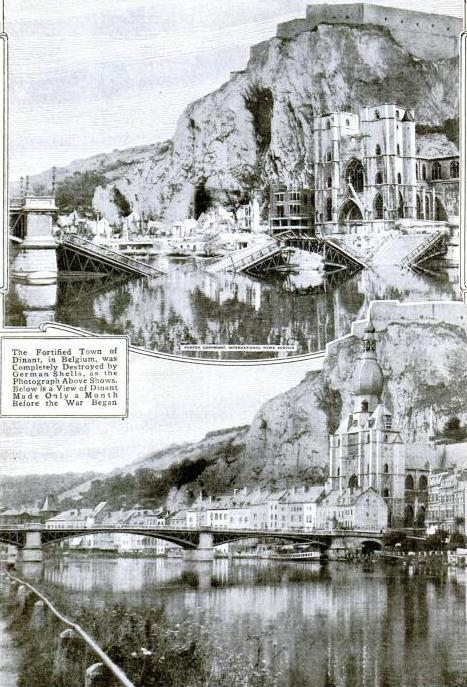
- Devastated Dinant (top) and as it was a month before the war (bottom)

- Sack of Dinant (Belgium)
- Native name: Sac de Dinant
- Location: 50°15′40″N 4°54′43″E; Dinant, Namur Province, Wallonia, Belgium
- Date: 21–28 August 1914
- Target: Belgian civilians
- Attack type: War crime, massacre
- Deaths: 674
- Perpetrator: Imperial German Army: Max von Hausen
- Motive: Presumed presence of francs-tireurs

The Sack of Dinant (Note: French: sac de Dinant) or Dinant massacre (Note: French: massacre de Dinant; German: Massaker von Dinant) refers to the mass execution of civilians, looting and sacking of Dinant, Neffe and Bouvignes-sur-Meuse in Belgium, perpetrated by German troops during the Battle of Dinant against the French in World War I. Convinced that the civilian population was hiding francs-tireurs, the German General Staff issued orders to execute the population and set fire to their houses.

On August 23, 1914, German troops carried out a brutal attack that led to the deaths of approximately 674 men, women, and children. The violence continued for several days, resulting in the destruction of about two-thirds of Dinant's buildings. Prior to this, the civilian population had been disarmed on August 6 and had been instructed not to resist the invading forces.

Belgium vehemently protested the massacre, and the global community was outraged, referring to the incident along with other atrocities during the German invasion as the "Rape of Belgium". Denied for many years, it was only in 2001 that the German government issued an official apology to both Belgium and the victims' descendants.

== Description ==
=== The locations ===
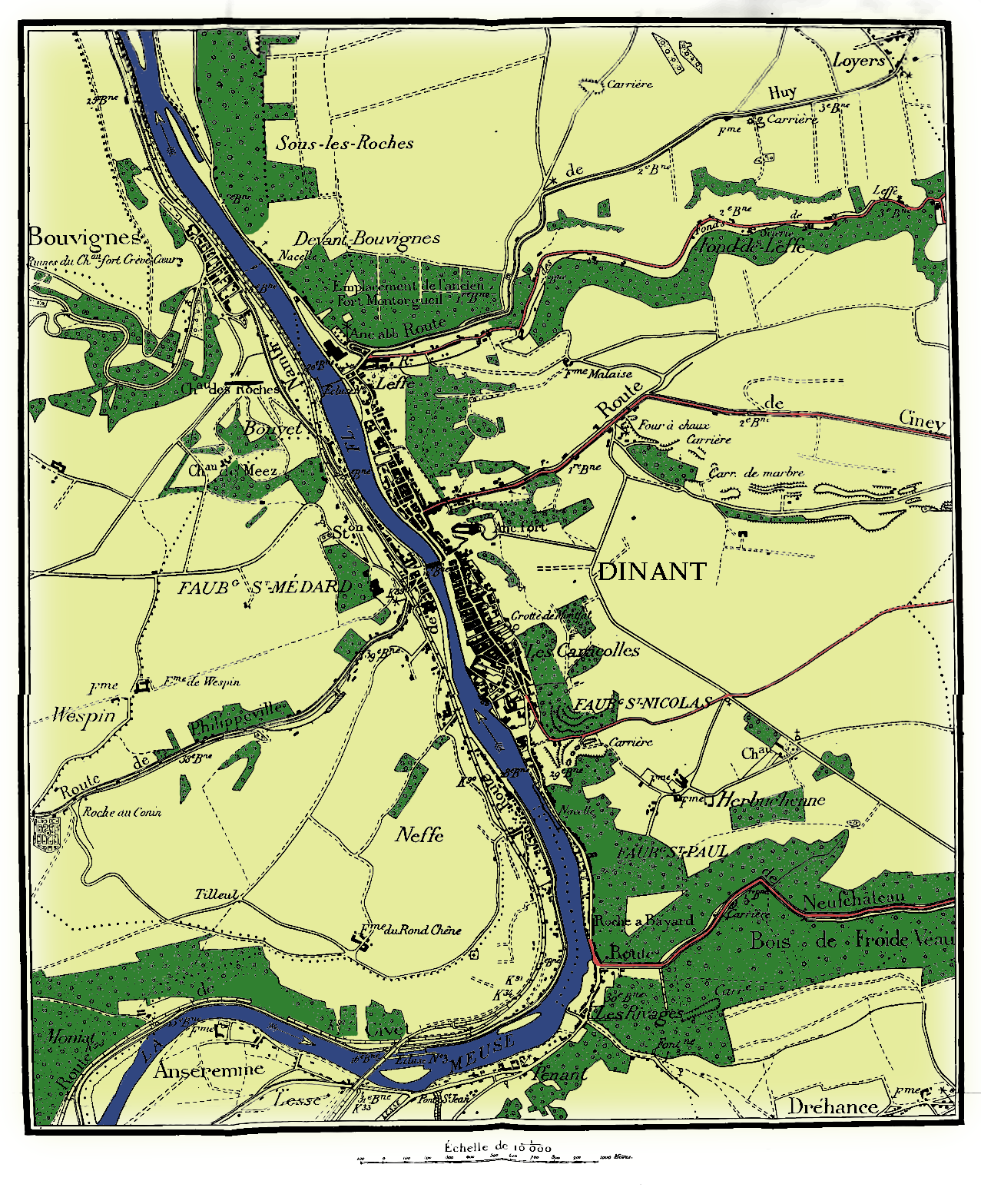
Dinant circa 1914

The topography of the region significantly influenced the outcome of the Dinant massacre. The town, primarily situated on the right bank of the Meuse River, is bordered by the river on one side and a rocky outcrop with a citadel, known as the "Montagne," on the other. Dinant extends approximately four kilometers from north to south. The narrower sections of the town, where the road and towpath are only a few meters wide, contrast with the broader areas, which measure up to three hundred meters. The main bridge across the Meuse connected the left-bank area of Saint-Médard with the station district on the right bank. In 1914, a pedestrian bridge linked the municipalities of Bouvignes-sur-Meuse (left bank) and Devant-Bouvignes (right bank). To the north of the town were the Abbaye Notre-Dame de Leffe neighborhood and Leffe faubourg. To the south, the Rivages and Saint-Nicolas neighborhoods extended from Froidvau. On the left bank, opposite the Bayard rock, was the village of Neffe. The town had limited access roads, which affected the German troops' ability to navigate and control the area during the attack.

=== Historical context ===
==== Start of World War I ====
On August 4, 1914, implementing the Schlieffen plan, the German army invaded Belgium shortly after issuing an ultimatum to the Belgian government, requesting permission for German troops to pass through Belgian territory. King Albert and his government refused to compromise Belgium's neutrality and territorial integrity.

In August 1914, Dinant had a population of 7,890. On August 6, 1914, Burgomaster Arthur Defoin ordered the residents of Dinant to deposit their weapons and ammunition at the town hall. This measure was also implemented in Bouvignes-sur-Meuse. (Note: "To the inhabitants of the City of Dinant. Notice is given to the inhabitants, under penalty of immediate arrest, to bring to the police office all wireless telegraphy transmission or reception equipment, firearms and ammunition in their possession. In Dinant, August 6, 1914. Le Bourgmestre, A. Defoin.") The mayor stated:

Inhabitants are formally warned that civilians may not engage in any attacks or violence by firearms or other weapons against enemy troops. Such attacks are prohibited by the just gentium and would expose their perpetrators, and perhaps even the town, to the most serious consequences. Dinant, August 6, 1914, A. Defoin.

On the morning of August 6, 1914, a company of thirty carabinieri-cyclists from the 1er régiment de chasseurs à pied arrived in Dinant. In the afternoon, the first German reconnaissance patrol made a quick incursion into town. Two uhlans advanced into rue Saint-Jacques, prompting the Garde Civique to open fire, though no hits were reported. A carabinieri-cyclist fired his rifle, wounding a German rider in the arm. The cyclist fled on foot but was quickly apprehended, while the wounded German was treated by Dr. Remy. In the evening, the vanguard of the French 5th Army, the 148th régiment d'infanterie, took up positions to defend the bridges at Bouvignes-sur-Meuse and Dinant. On August 7, the carabinieri-cyclists were recalled to Namur. Over the following days, skirmishes occurred between the French and German forces, with a hussar being killed on August 11. The Germans subsequently ceased their scouting missions and employed their air force to assess the troop deployments.

==== German defeat of August 15, 1914 ====
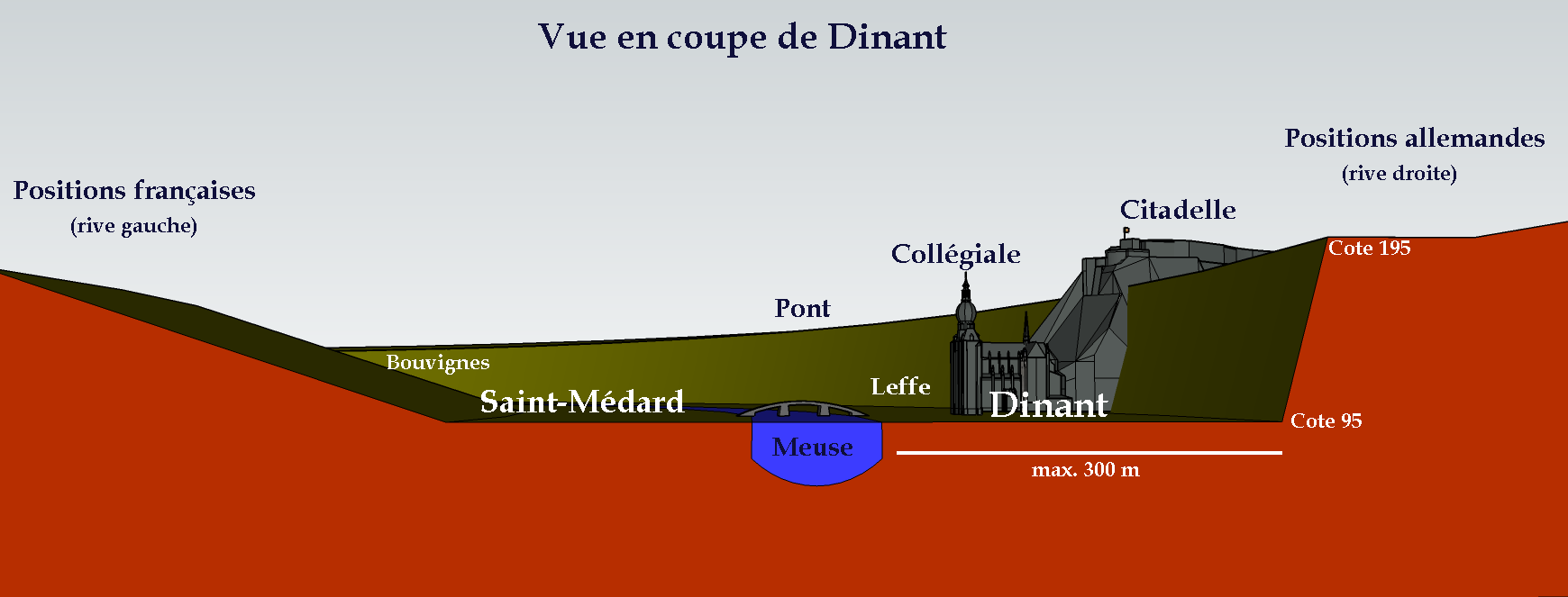

Two cavalry divisions, commanded by Lieutenant-General von Richtoffen, formed the vanguard of the 3rd German Army. These divisions consisted of the Guards Cavalry Division and the 5th Division, supported by 4-5 battalions of chasseurs à pied, along with two groups of artillery and machine guns. The infantry component, numbering over 5,000 men, was tasked with crossing the Meuse River between Houx (Belgium), Dinant, and Anseremme.

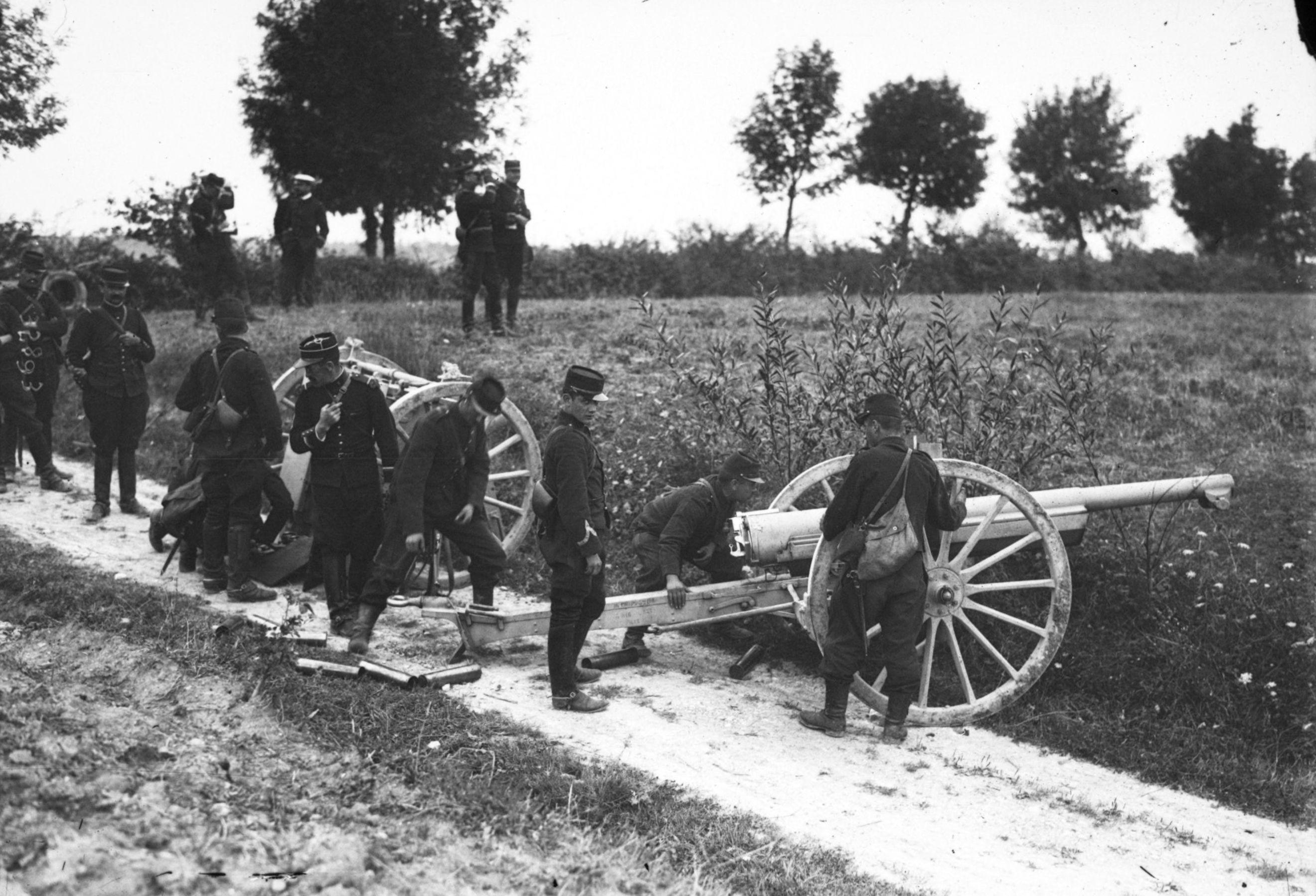
A 75 mm cannon in action during the French army's major maneuvers of 1913

At 6 a.m. on August 15, the Germans commenced bombing both banks of the Meuse. The bombardment first targeted the civil hospital, despite its prominent red cross. The Château de Bouvignes, repurposed as a field hospital for wounded French soldiers, was similarly destroyed. The fighting intensified as the German forces captured the citadel overlooking the town and attempted to cross the Meuse. They were close to succeeding when the French Deligny division, newly authorized to intervene, used its 75 mm guns to silence the German artillery and help repel the assault.

The Germans eventually withdrew from Dinant, leaving behind approximately three thousand dead, wounded, prisoners, or missing. When the people of Dinant saw the French flag replacing the German colors atop the citadel, they sang "La Marseillaise". In the citadel, the French discovered that wounded French soldiers had been brutally killed; one corporal of the 148th was found hanging by his belt from a shrub, with his genitals mutilated. Over the following week, enemy troops reorganized. General Lanrezac and his forces advanced to Entre-Sambre-et-Meuse, while von Hausen's troops positioned themselves along the front between Namur and Givet.

==== The myth of the francs-tireurs ====
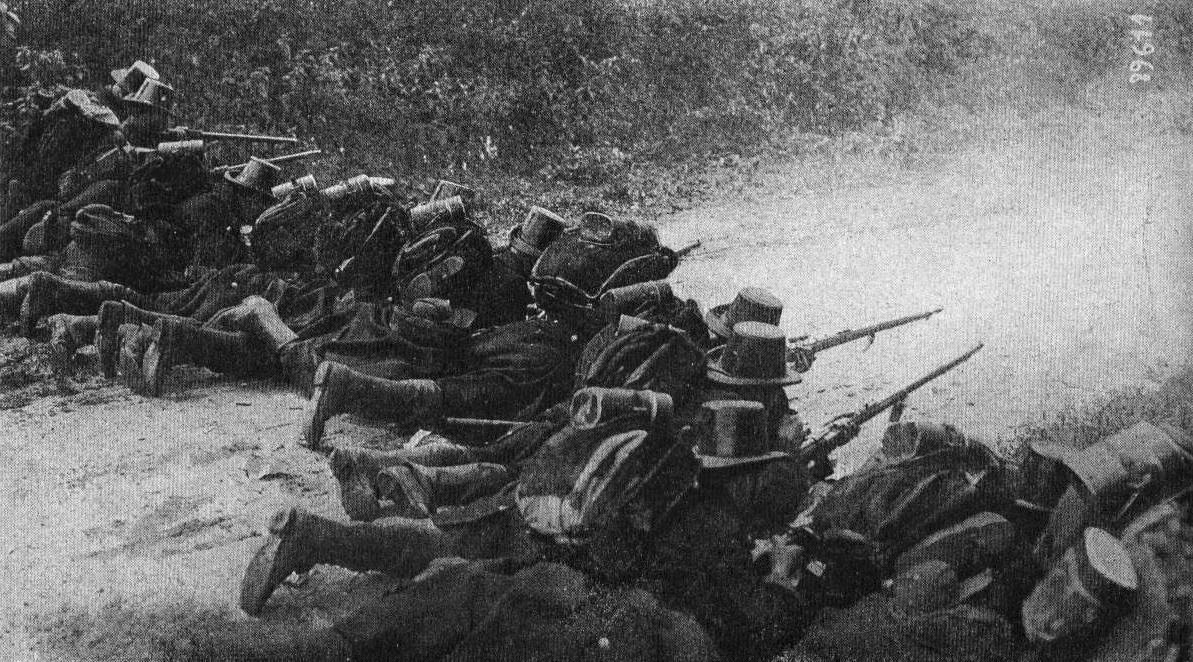
The Garde Civique in 1914 in Herstal

Since the Franco-Prussian War of 1870, the concept of "francs-tireurs" has been a significant concern among German soldiers and their leaders. Manuals on military strategy, such as Kriegsgebrauch im Landkriege, published in 1902, even advised officers and troops to adopt severe measures against "francs-tireurs." This belief heavily influenced the perception and actions of Saxon troops during August 1914. When patrols went missing or the source of gunfire was unclear, "francs-tireurs" were often blamed. Officers sometimes propagated rumors, occasionally driven by a desire to incite hostility and aggression among their forces.

Moreover, the presence of the Civic Guard during the early stages of the invasion reinforced the German perception of it as an armed civilian militia. Established during the Belgian Revolution of 1830, the Civic Guard is composed of middle-class citizens tasked with protecting the territorial integrity of Belgium. On August 6, a community ordinance disarmed the civilian population of Dinant; however, the Civic Guard, which remained mobilized until the morning of August 15, was not disarmed until August 18.

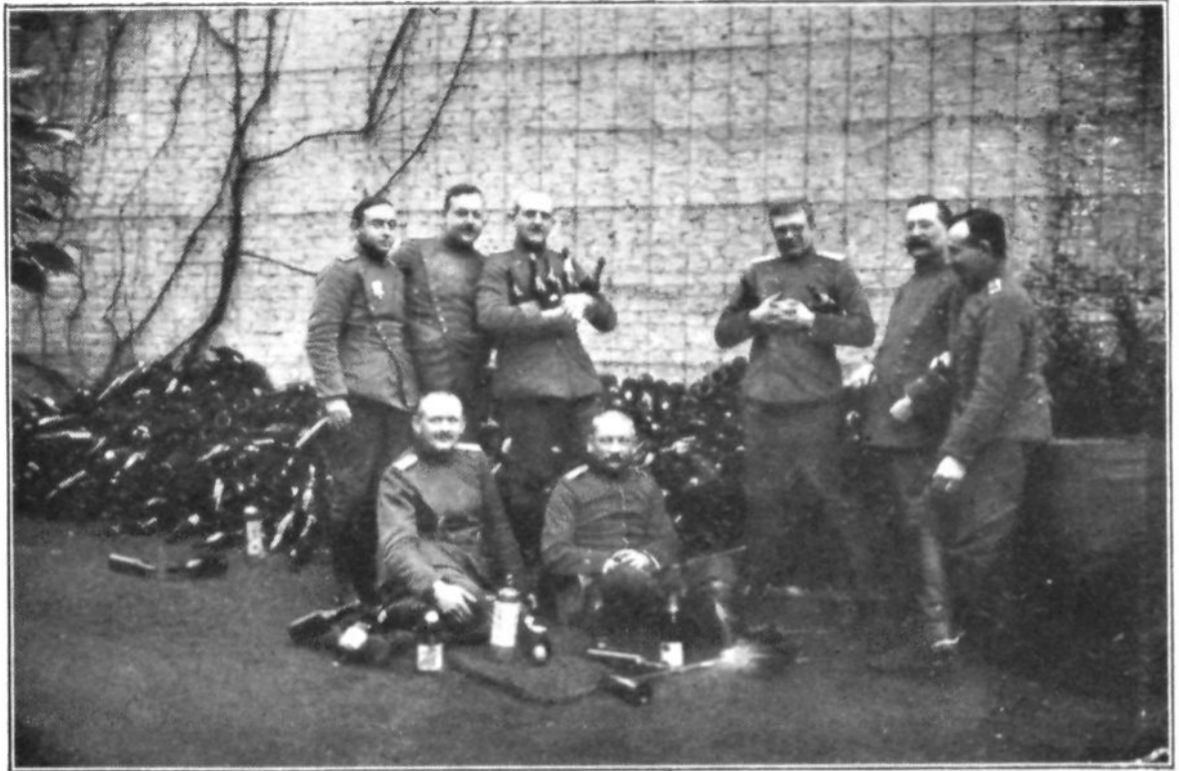
German officers in a property requisitioned for Colonel Beeger, the military commander of Dinant, and his staff

The crushing defeat on August 15, which resulted in 3,000 soldiers being wounded, coupled with the playing of "La Marseillaise" after the town was liberated, exacerbated the animosity of the occupying German forces towards the local population. As a consequence, "eight days later, the enemy avenged themselves cruelly on the residents of Dinant."

From August 21 onwards, German troops grappled with the trauma of this perceived defiance. Alcohol, looted from homes, was heavily consumed as a means to sustain morale, leading to increased disorder and chaos throughout the subsequent week.

The city of Dinant, situated at the bottom of a steep, narrow valley, presented challenges in identifying the source of the gunfire and tracking projectiles that ricocheted off its rocky terrain. French troops positioned on the elevated terrain of the left bank fired whenever they found an advantageous angle. The disordered fighting and smoke from fires often led to German soldiers being inadvertently shot by their comrades. These conditions reinforced the German soldiers' belief that they were being targeted by enemy francs-tireurs. This distorted perception of reality, exacerbated by the stress of battle, led to what Arie Nicolaas Jan den Hollander terms "war psychosis", driving the soldiers to engage in violent reprisals.

=== The unfolding of events ===
==== The day before: "Tomorrow, Dinant all burned and killed!" ====
On August 21, certain German officers enunciated their intentions unambiguously. A captain informed the parish priest of Lisogne, "Tomorrow, Dinant will be burned and killed! We have lost too many men!"

During the night of August 21 to 22, the civilian population of Dinant experienced their first skirmishes. A German reconnaissance patrol, joined by a number of unruly soldiers, raided Rue Saint-Jacques. This operation involved a diverse battalion, including members of the 2nd Battalion of the No. 108 Rifle Regiment and the 1st Company of the No. 12 Pioneer Battalion. The patrol advanced (Note: The troop consisted of around 150 men. They had requisitioned a vehicle on which they had mounted a machine gun (Coleau et al., 2014, p. 226).) from the elevated area on the right bank and reached as far as the Meuse. The German forces killed seven civilians and used incendiary explosives devices to destroy approximately twenty houses, resulting in the deaths of five more people. The Germans described this as a "reconnaissance in force" operation, while Maurice Tschoffen characterized it as "the escapade of a group of drunken soldiers." According to the war diary of one of the battalions involved, the raid was ordered at the brigade level with the intent to capture Dinant, expel its defenders, and cause maximum destruction. After the war, Soldier Rasch recounted an incident where, upon reaching Rue Saint-Jacques one night, the soldiers, seeing a lit café, threw a hand grenade inside, leading to a fusillade. (Note: This was the Hôtel Saint-Jacques café on the corner of Route de Ciney (Lipkes 2007, p. 263).) This act exacerbated the panic, with gunfire appearing to come from all directions, including from residential homes. Rasch’s company lost eight soldiers, and his captain was severely injured. In total, the raid resulted in the deaths of 19 German soldiers and injuries to 117 others. Contributing factors to the high German casualties included the use of torches by German troops, which made them easy targets for French soldiers, and the possibility that, in the chaos, German soldiers may have accidentally fired on their comrades. This incident further entrenched the myth of the francs-tireurs.

The initial disturbances prompted many residents to flee from the right bank for safety. They were required to present passes issued by local authorities to cross to the left bank. Due to the barricading of the Dinant and Bouvignes bridges, some families escaped via tourist barges. Approximately 2,500 individuals from Dinant managed to find refuge behind French lines. However, by noon on August 22, the French authorities prohibited further crossings to avoid disrupting troop movements. The French 5th Army’s First Corps was replaced by the 51st Reserve Infantry Division and the 273rd Infantry Regiment (France). A small group from the British Expeditionary Force was also in the area. The 51st Reserve Infantry Division thus faced three German army corps across a front extending over thirty kilometers. At Dinant, the 273rd Infantry Regiment confronted the XIIth Army Corps (1st Saxon Corps) of the entire Saxon Army. Given the impracticality of a French assault, the French forces focused on obstructing the German XII Corps' crossing of the Meuse. Consequently, in the mid-afternoon, the French detonated the Bouvignes-sur-Meuse bridge while preserving the Dinant bridge. They entrenched themselves on the left bank, abandoning their efforts to maintain a presence on the right bank while preparing for the approaching German forces.

==== August 23, 1914: the Ransack of Dinant ====
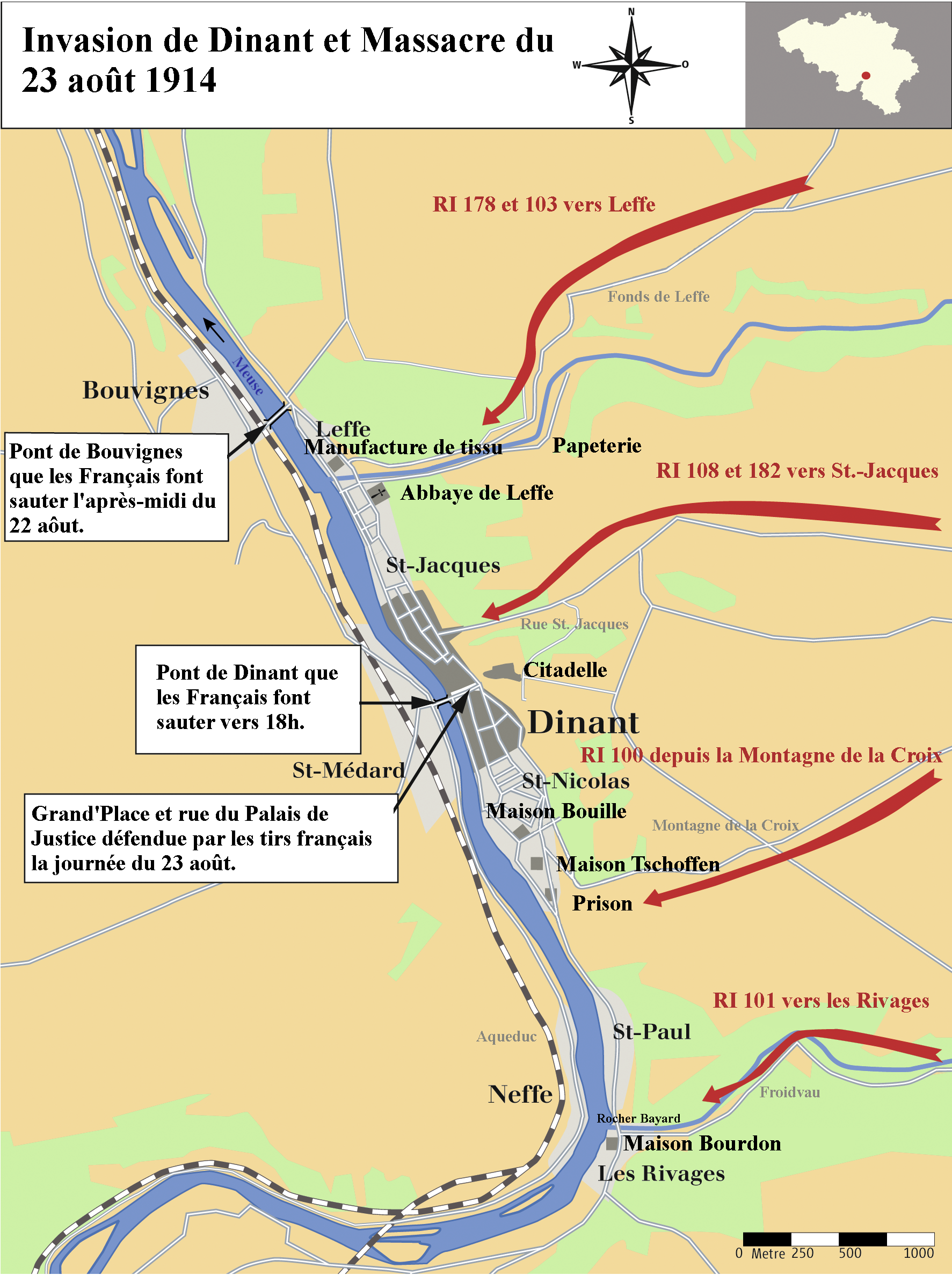

On August 23, 1914, the XIIth Army Corps (1st Saxon Corps) entered Dinant via four separate routes. To the north, the 32nd Division advanced through the sector between Houx and the Faubourg de Leffe. The 178th Regiment of the 64th Brigade moved through the Fonds de Leffe. As they progressed, German forces killed all civilians in their path. Thirteen men were shot at Pré Capelle by six men from the 103rd Saxon Regiment, and seventy-one were murdered near the "paper mill." Paul Zschocke, a non-commissioned officer in the 103rd Infantry Regiment, reported being ordered by his company commander to search for "francs-tireurs" and "shoot anyone found". Houses were systematically searched, and civilians were either executed or taken to the Prémontrés Abbey. At ten o'clock in the morning, the abbey's religious, unaware of the impending danger, gathered the 43 men present at the request of the German officers. They were subsequently shot in Place de l'Abbaye. (Note: The shooting took place at a place called "à la Cliche de Bois". After a first volley, an officer intervened and said: "The hour of Justice is over: those who are still alive can get up, they are free...", the survivors got up and were mowed down by a second volley (Evrard 1919, p. 8).) The monks were held hostage under the pretext that they had fired on German troops. Major Fränzel, who spoke French, demanded a ransom of 60,000 Belgian francs, which was later reduced to 15,000 Belgian francs after consultation with his superiors.

That evening, 108 civilians who had been hiding in the cellars of the large Leffe fabric factory decided to surrender. The factory director, Remy Himmer, who was also the vice-consul of the Argentine Republic, along with his relatives and some workers, was immediately arrested. Women and children were sent to the Prémontrés convent. Despite protests from Lieutenant-Colonel Blegen, Remy Himmer and 30 men were executed in Place de l'Abbaye, which was still strewn with the morning’s victims. Later that evening, the Grande Manufacture was set on fire. The massacre continued throughout the night in the Abbey district: houses were looted and burned, and male civilians were shot. By the time the Germans left Leffe, only a dozen men remained alive. The 32nd Division then constructed a boat bridge opposite the Pâtis de Leffe and crossed the Meuse.

Regiments No. 108 and No. 182 of the 46th Brigade, along with the 12th and 48th Artillery Regiments, advanced down Rue Saint-Jacques. By 6:30 a.m., their vanguard had reached the slaughterhouse, which was soon set ablaze. Finding fewer civilians in the dwellings, the German forces set fire to the entire district. All male civilians who had remained in the area were executed without exception. In the afternoon, a platoon from the 108th Infantry Regiment discovered around one hundred civilians seeking refuge in the Nicaise brewery. The women and children were sent to the Leffe Abbey, while the thirty men were taken to Rue des Tanneries. There, they were lined up along the Mur Laurent and executed. Three of the men managed to escape under the cover of dusk.

During the conflict, looted furniture from nearby houses was used by members of the 182nd Infantry Regiment to construct a barricade. Despite being unarmed, a young man suspected of being a sniper was captured, bound, and used as a human shield. As their troops were firing upon them, the unit shot and killed the hostage before retreating.

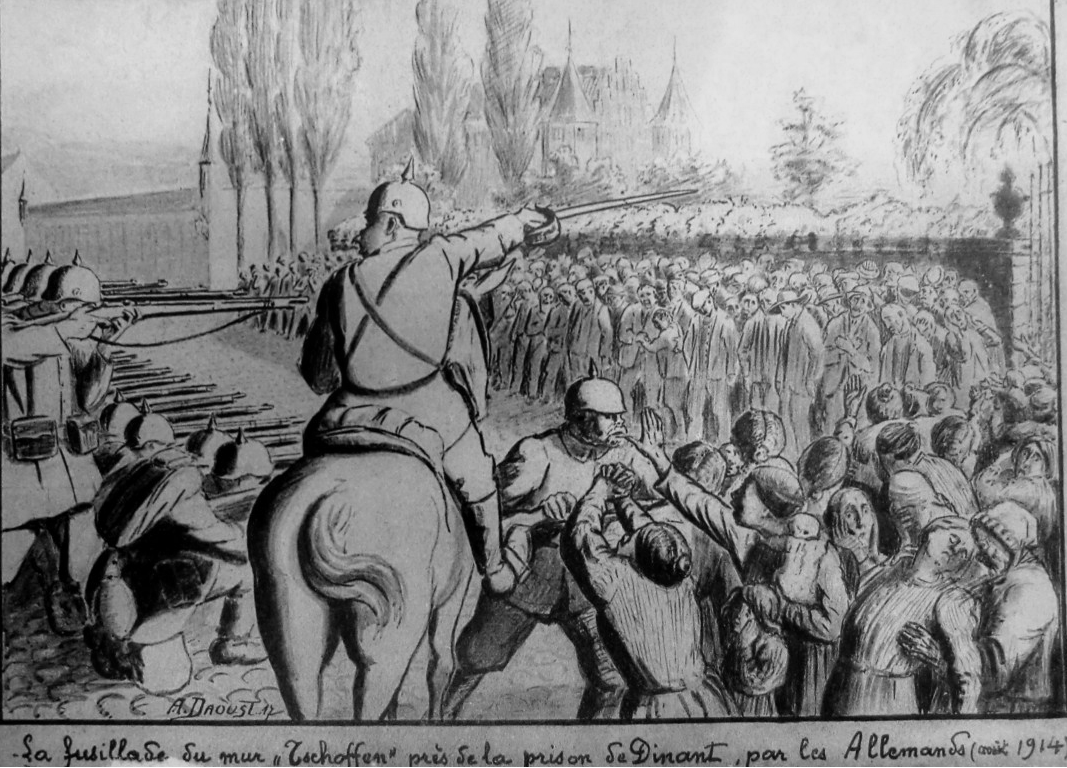
Alexandre Daoust's evocation of the shooting at the Tschoffen wall (in the background, the prison) in 1917

The German 100th Regiment descended from Montagne de la Croix and launched an assault on the Saint-Nicolas district. The area was systematically ravaged from eight in the morning until eight in the evening. (Note: Statement by Lieutenant-Colonel Kielmannsegg.) Maurice Tschoffen, a witness to the events, described how soldiers marched in two lines alongside the houses, with those on the right monitoring the left, both with their fingers on the triggers, prepared to fire at any moment. Groups of soldiers formed in front of each doorway, stopping to fire at the houses, focusing particularly on the windows. Numerous bombs were thrown into the cellars. Two men were fatally shot on their doorstep. Similar to the events on Rue Saint-Jacques, civilians were used as human shields in Place d'Armes, with some being struck by French bullets fired from across the river. Taking advantage of the chaos, the German forces crossed the square and advanced towards the Rivages area. They set houses on fire and gathered civilians at the Bouille house, later dispersing them among various buildings, including the café, forge, and stables. As the fires spread, they directed them towards the prison. Eventually, men and women were separated at the base of Croix Mountain. Despite being asked to leave, the women and children stayed behind, waiting for news of their husbands, brothers, and sons. Some men were imprisoned, while 137 others were arranged in four rows along Maurice Tschoffen's garden wall. Colonel Bernhard Kielmannsegg of the 100th Infantry Regiment issued the order for execution. Following this, two rounds of gunfire and machine-gun fire were directed at the bodies from the Frankinet garden's terrace. While approximately 30 men pretended to be dead, 109 were killed. Most of the wounded individuals escaped from the pile of corpses during the night, and five of them were later apprehended and executed. Major von Loeben, who led one of the two execution teams (the other led by Lieutenant von Ehrenthal), testified to a German inquiry commission, stating, "I presume that these were the men who had engaged in hostile activities against our troops".

To the south of Dinant, the German 101st Regiment arrived that afternoon via the Froidvau road and constructed a boat bridge upstream from Bayard Rock. Several civilians were taken hostage, including a group from Neffe who were forced to cross the river on boats. Around 5 p.m., the Germans faced intense gunfire from the left bank despite advancing 40 meters along the Meuse. Claiming that the French were firing upon them, the Germans executed 89 hostages against the wall of the Bourdon garden. This incident resulted in the deaths of 76 individuals, including 38 women and seven children, the youngest being three-week-old Madeleine Fivet. Following this, the 101st Regiment crossed the Meuse to Neffe. A group of 55 civilians had sought refuge in a small aqueduct beneath the railroad line. Under the command of Karl Adolf von Zeschau, the regiment attacked with rifles and grenades, resulting in the deaths of 23 civilians and injuries to 12 others.

The Dinant bridge was destroyed by the French around 6 p.m. on August 23 as they retreated along the Philippeville road. German brutality continued in the following days before eventually diminishing. Civilians who emerged from hiding too soon often faced execution. In the aftermath, civilians were forced to bury the numerous bodies scattered across the pavements and plazas of Dinant and its surroundings.

Earlier, at the prison, the Germans separated the women and children from the men. The men, aware of their impending fate, received absolution from a priest. Confusion arose when gunfire near the Tschoffen wall led some prisoners and their jailers to believe that the French were attempting to retake the town. However, the execution did not take place, and the prisoners were eventually moved to Bayard Rock. The women and children were forced to march to Dréhance and Anseremme. The 416 men, under Captain Hammerstein's command, awaited deportation to Germany. They were directed to Marche and then transferred to Melreux (Belgium) station. The men were divided into groups of 40 and transported in cattle cars to Kassel prison in Germany.

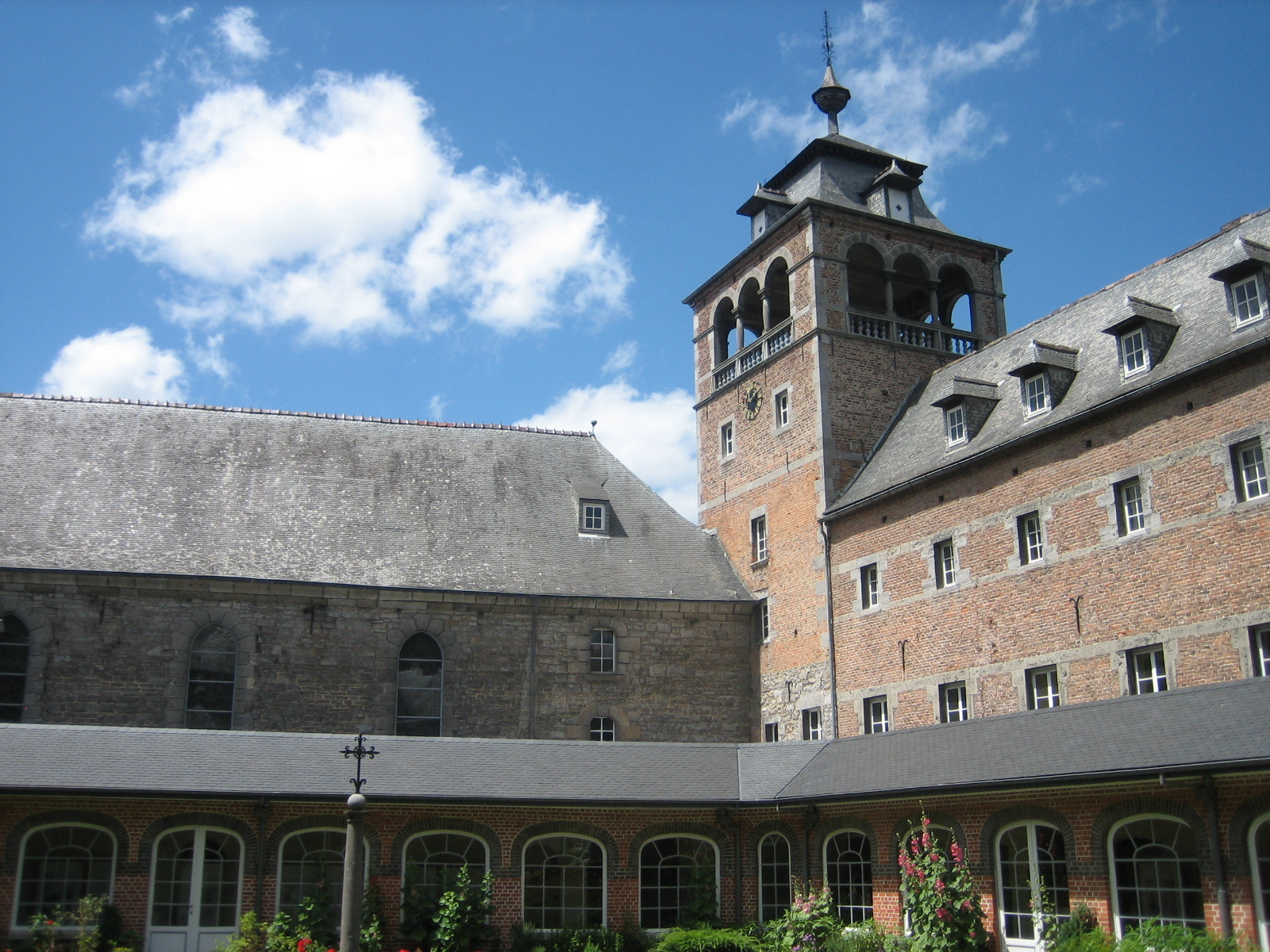
The cloister of Abbaye Notre-Dame de Leffe

The prisoners' journey was severely hampered by the brutality inflicted by German troops and the local populations they encountered. Some individuals were executed without trial after experiencing severe mental distress. The conditions of imprisonment were extremely harsh, leading to the deaths of some prisoners who had been seriously injured during the Dinant events and subsequently deported. Prison regulations prohibited family members from sharing the same cell. Furthermore, four inmates were required to share cells measuring only 9 m², with no straw mattresses provided. During the first eight days, prisoners were not permitted any outdoor excursions. The schedule was later adjusted to allow one outing per week, which was eventually increased to three. Maurice Tschoffen, the King's Public Prosecutor in Belgium, reported that the prison governor informed him that the military authorities in Berlin were convinced that no shots had been fired in Dinant. The source of this assertion is unclear. Tschoffen noted that there appeared to be no justification for their arrest, though the reasons for their eventual release remained uncertain. In a subsequent discussion in Belgium, General von Longchamps shared his findings on the Dinant events, stating, "From my investigation, it appears that no civilians fired at Dinant; however, there might have been some French soldiers disguised as civilians who fired. Additionally, in combat training, individuals can sometimes exceed the limits of their training."

Thirty-three clergymen were apprehended at the regimental school in Dinant and were later imprisoned in Marche for one month.

==== Dinant in ruins ====
During the sack, 750 buildings were burnt down or demolished, with two-thirds of the buildings destroyed.

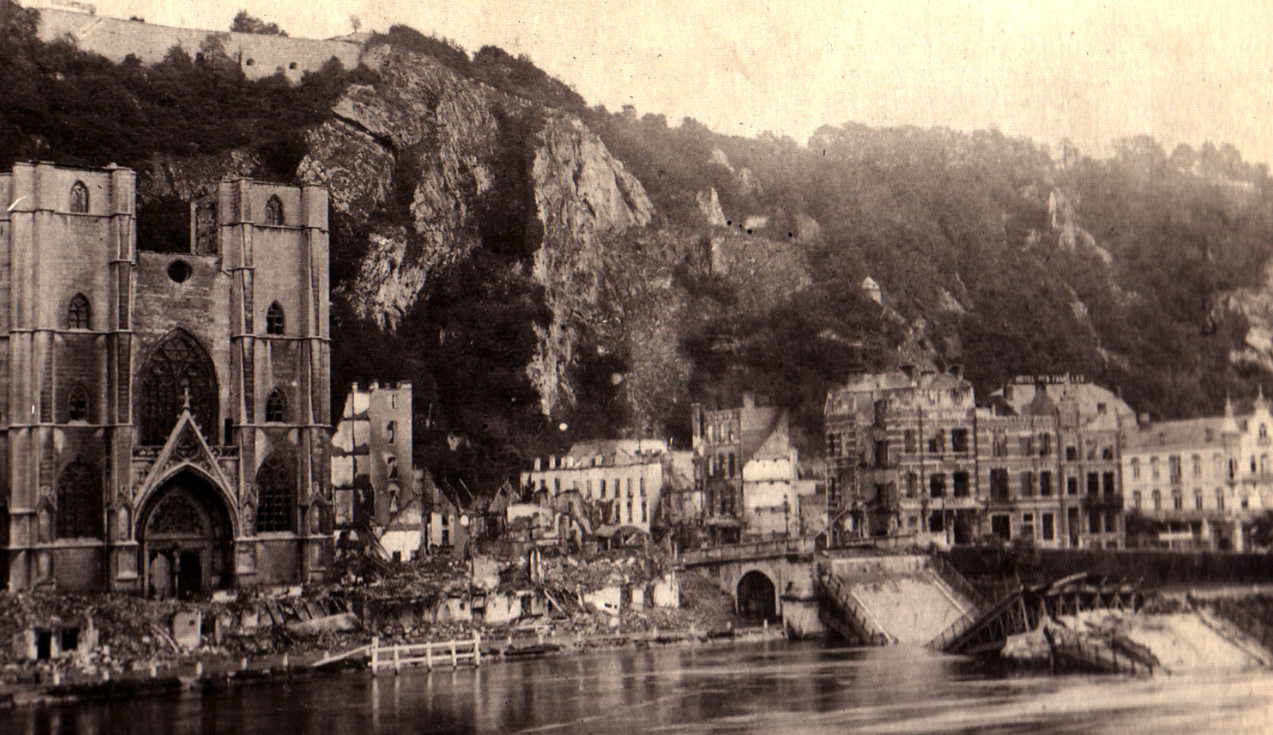
The collegiate church and the destroyed bridge

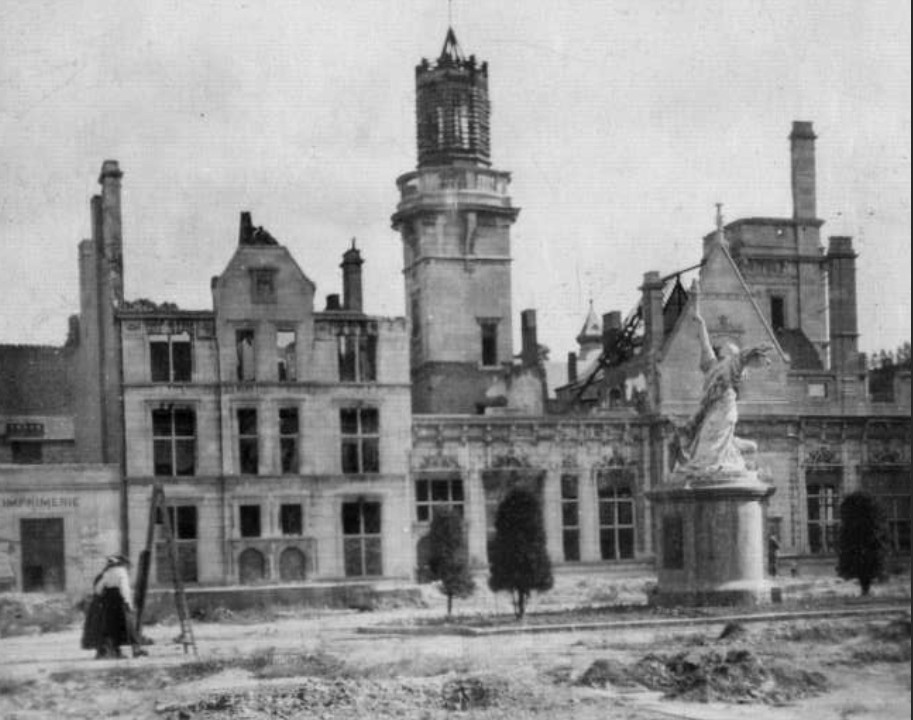
The City Hall

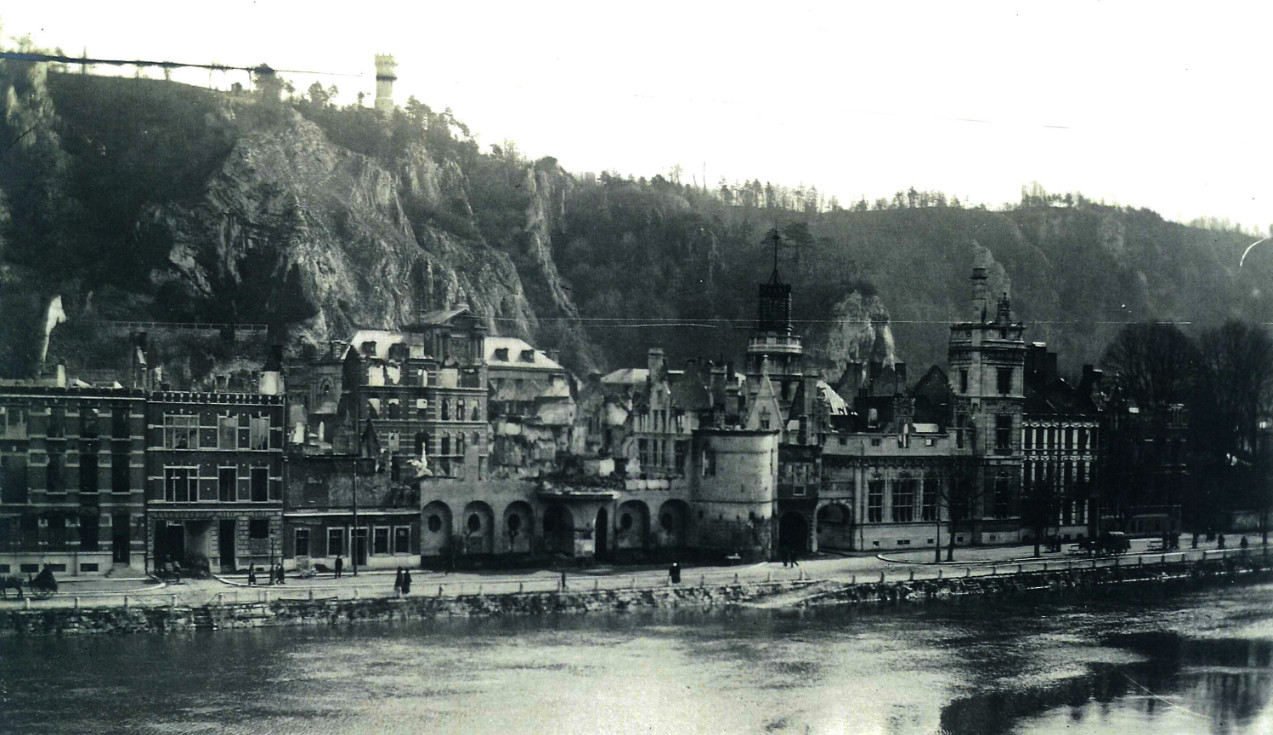
The City Hall and Post Office from the left bank

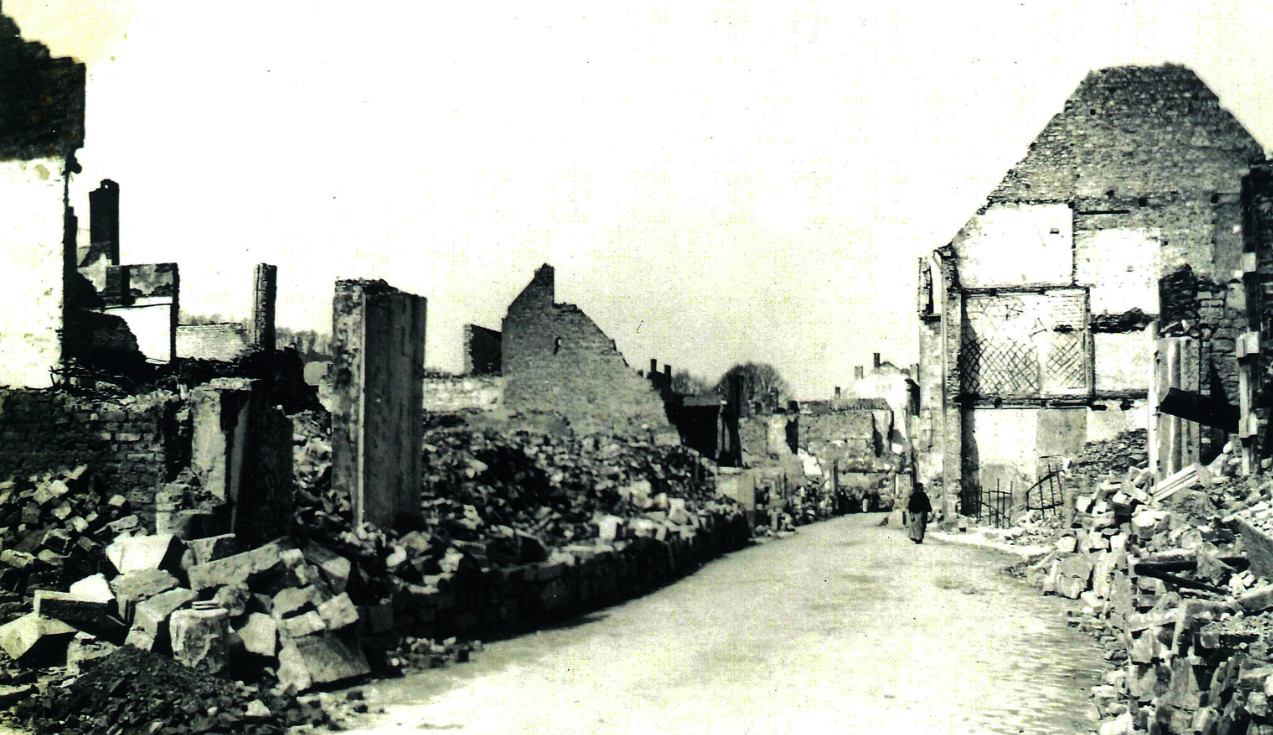
Rue Grande

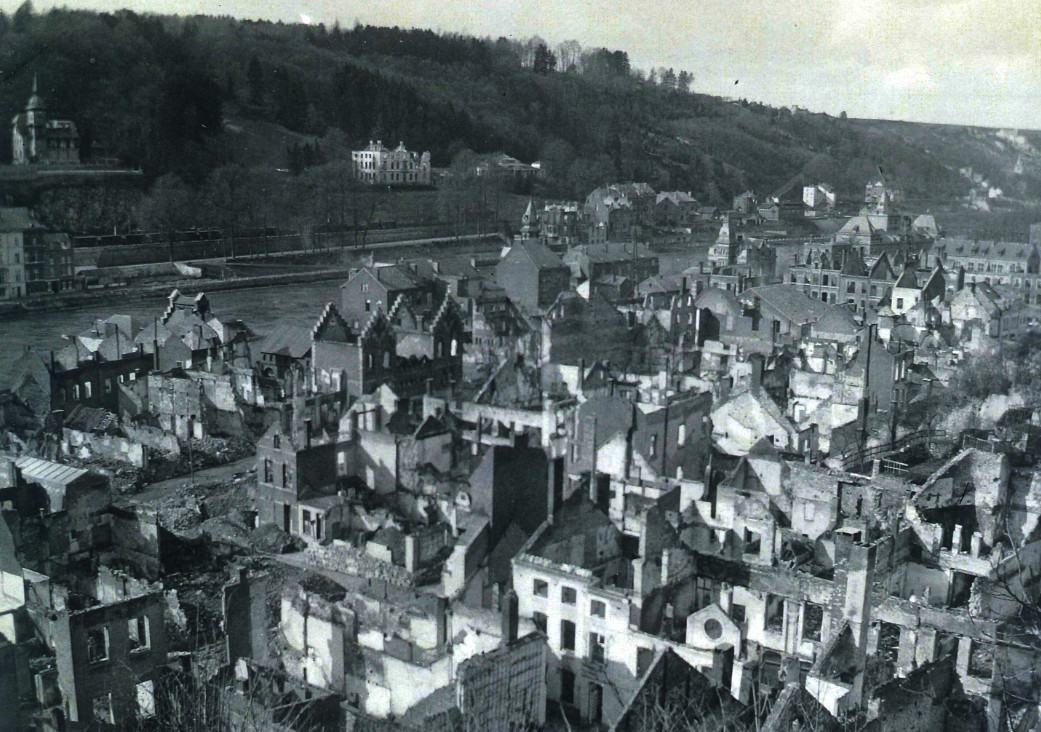
The Saint-Pierre district

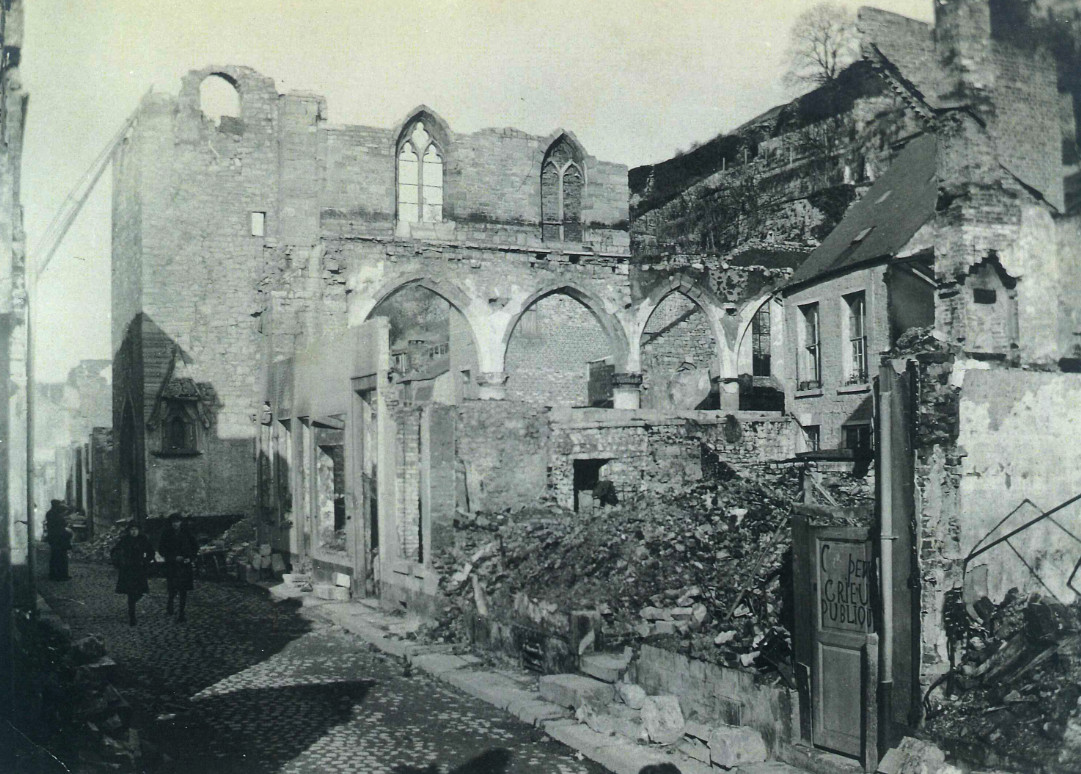
Saint-Pierre church

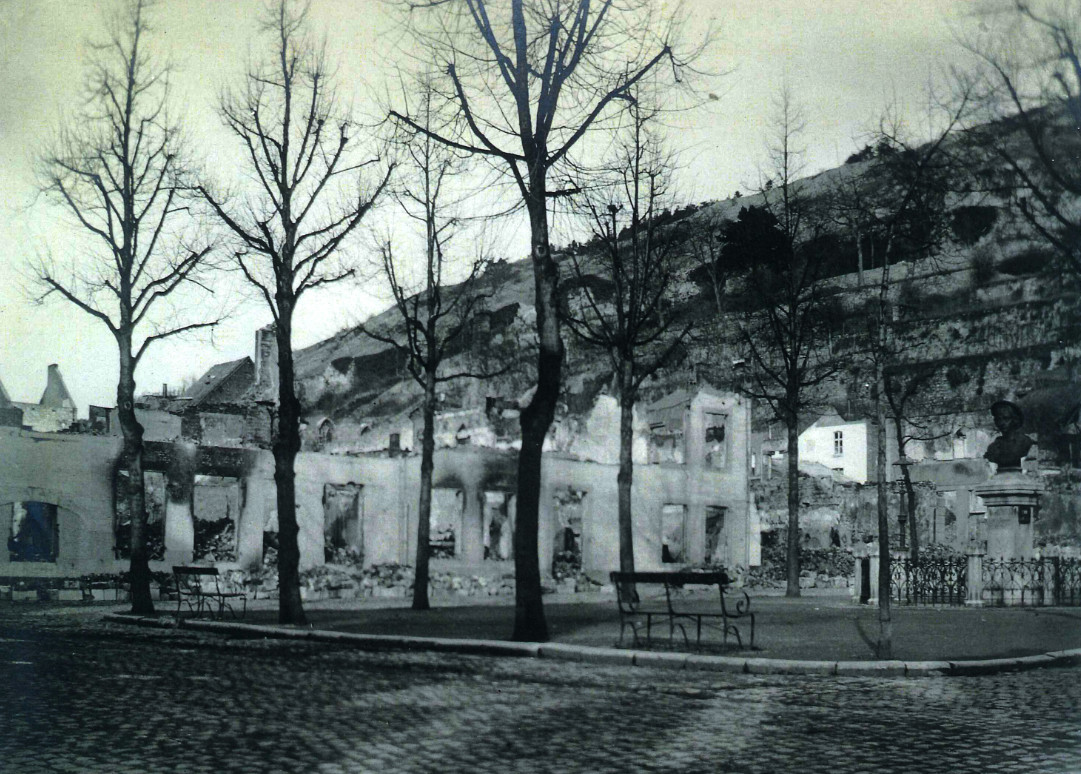
Place Patenier

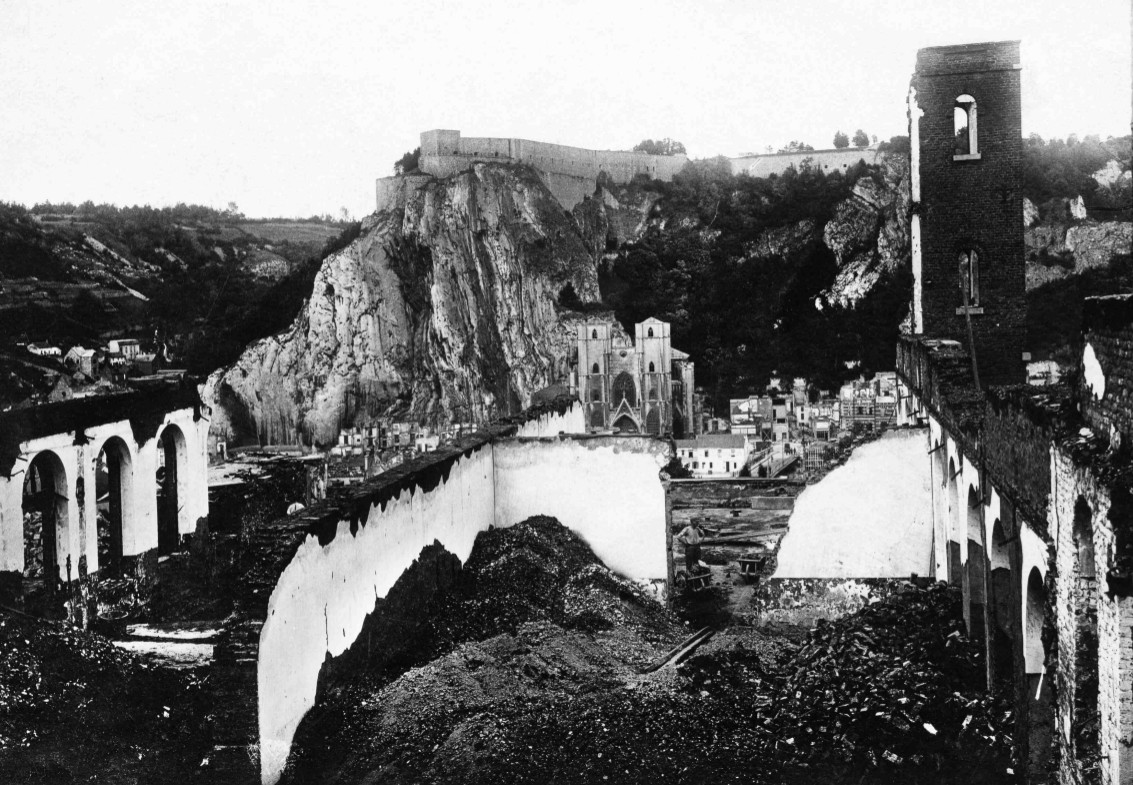
The ruins of Belle-vue College

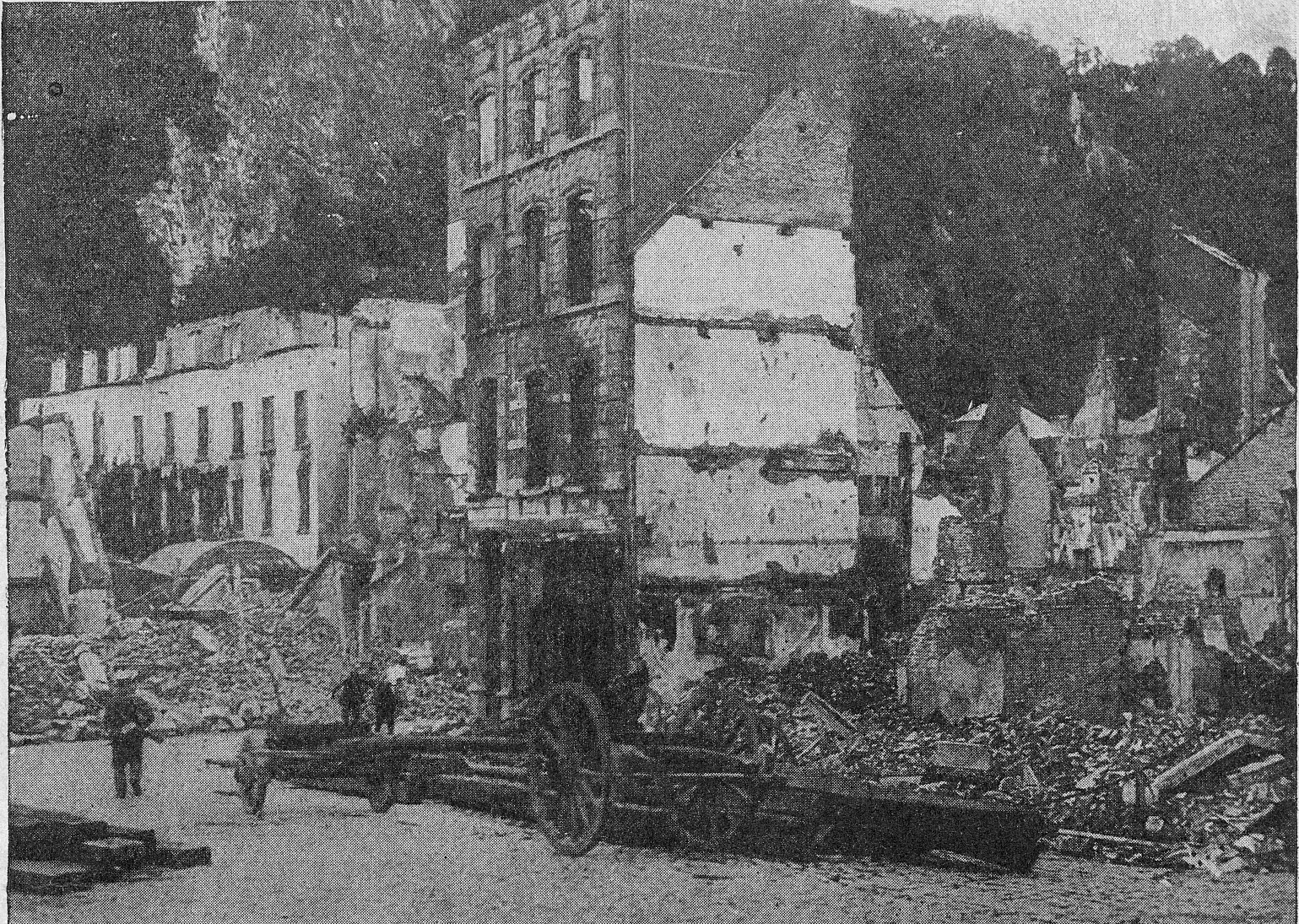
Dinant was in ruins in March 1915, with only the roads cleared.

=== The protagonists of the event ===
==== The German command ====
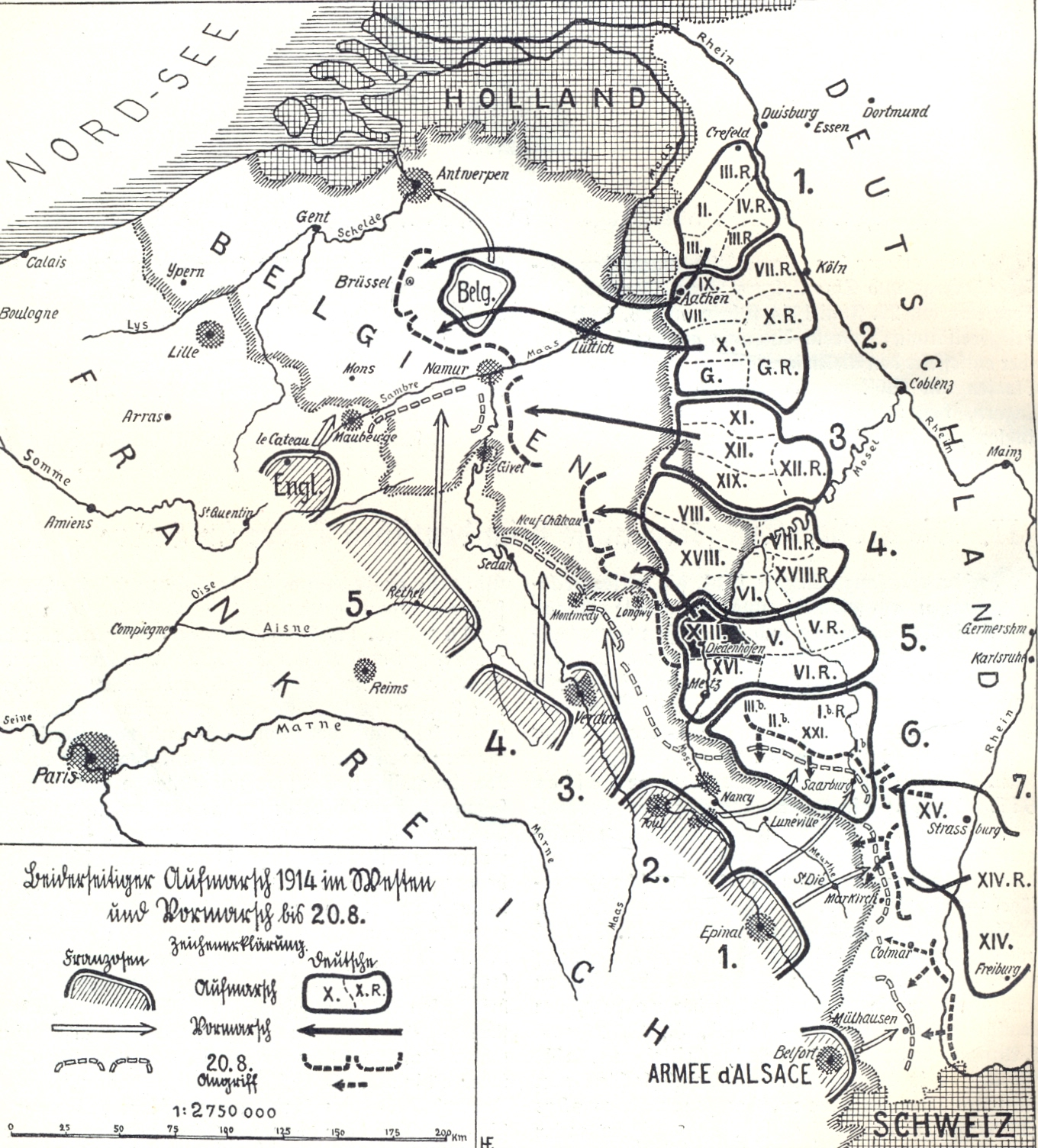
The mission of the XIIth Corps of the 3rd Army: Dinant

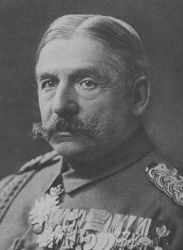
Max von Hausen commander of the 3rd German Army

The Third German Army was under the command of Saxon Max von Hausen and was organized into three corps. The XII Corps (1st Saxon Corps), commanded by Karl Ludwig d'Elsa, was assigned the task of capturing Dinant and crossing the Meuse at that location. The XII Corps was further subdivided into two divisions: the 32nd Infantry Division, commanded by Lieutenant-General Horst Edler von der Planitz, and the 23rd Infantry Division, led by Karl von Lindeman.

Max von Hausen, a veteran of the Franco-Prussian War of 1870, advised the civilian population to refrain from taking up arms against German troops. As a result, the directive at all levels of command was to "treat civilians with the utmost rigor."

The German General Staff began receiving reports of snipers in the east as the 3rd Army assembled. The civilian population, allegedly incited by a biased press, the clergy, and the government, was purportedly acting on prearranged instructions. In response, it was deemed essential to address the situation with the utmost seriousness and implement stringent measures without delay.

The belief in the "franc-tireurs myth" led the Germans to take severe actions against the civilian population. During the Battle of Dinant, certain battalions and regiments were ordered to engage in acts of intimidation against civilians. This directive was part of the broader strategy in the conflict with the French.

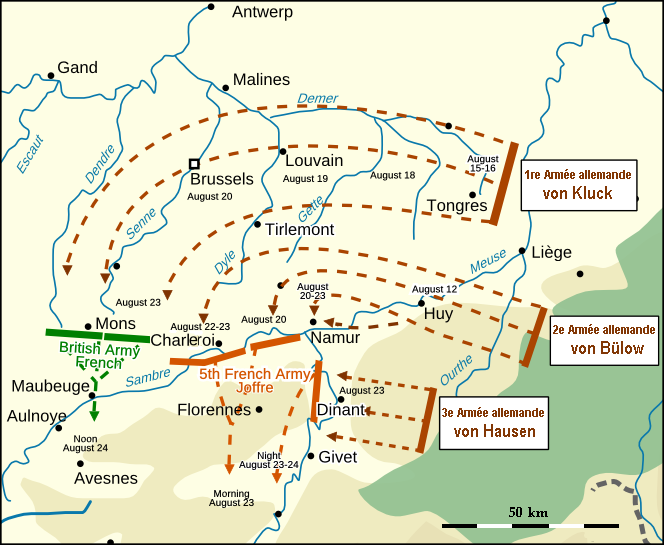
German advance in August 1914

This situation was evident with Infantry Regiment No. 178, commanded by Colonel Kurt von Reyher, who was under the overall command of Brigade Commander General Major Morgenstern-Döring. The troops were instructed to use forceful measures and act ruthlessly without regard for the perceived rebellious civilians. Major Kock of the 2nd Battalion was directed by von Reyher to "purge the houses." Captain Wilke, who commanded the 6th and later the 9th company, led several operations aimed at intimidating the civilian population, particularly in the Fonds de Leffe and at the abbey.

According to the 23rd Infantry Division’s reports, the executions, looting, and burning in Les Rivages, St. Nicolas district, and Neffe, south of the city, were primarily carried out by the 101st Saxon Grenadier Regiment, led by Colonel Meister, and the 100th Infantry Regiment, commanded by Lieutenant-Colonel Kilmannsegg, under the coordination of Staff Warrant Officer Karl Adolf von Zeschau. Major Schlick, commanding the 3rd and 4th companies of Regiment No. 101, was notably active in these operations.

After the sacking of Leffe, the 178th Infantry Regiment crossed the Meuse following the withdrawal of French troops and arrived in Bouvignes-sur-Meuse, where it committed numerous violent acts resulting in the deaths of 31 individuals. The German Third Army, having been delayed for one week, continued its advance, leaving behind a country devastated by looting, arson, and civilian executions. The Germans faced both the French forces and the perceived threat of francs-tireurs.

In February 1915, the first issue of the clandestine La Libre Belgique asserted: "There is something more robust than the Germans; it is the truth."

==== The victims ====
During the siege of Dinant, 674 civilians lost their lives, including 92 women, 18 individuals over the age of 60, and 16 individuals under the age of 15. (Note: In addition to these 674 identified victims, there were three whose bodies could not be identified, bringing the total number of victims to 677.) Among the 577 male victims, 76 were over the age of 60 and 22 were under the age of 15. The oldest victim was 88 years old, and 14 children were under the age of 5, with the youngest being only 3 weeks old.

A list of the victims' names was quickly circulated through an obituary. The first edition, published in 1915 by Dom Norbert Nieuwland, listed 606 names. The occupying military authorities required the population to provide copies of this obituary under threat of severe punishment.

In 1922, Nieuwland and Schmitz recorded 674 victims, including 5 who were missing. By 1928, Nieuwland and Tschoffen confirmed the same number of victims and missing persons. Finally, just before the centennial, Michel Coleau and Michel Kellner revised the obituary and identified a total of 674 victims and three unidentified individuals.

See the obituary
#	Surname	Name	Sex	Age	<15 years old	Profession	Location
1	Absil	Joseph	M	46		weaver	Paper Mill
2	Absil	Lambert	M	59		stone mason	Devant-Bouvignes
3	Adnet	Ferdinand	M	48		car rental	Tschoffen Wall
4	Alardo	Isidore	M	20		cultivator	Bonair
5	Alardo	Joseph	M	18		cultivator	Herbuchenne (Alardo farm)
6	Alardo	Martin	M	53		farmer	Bonair
7	Alardo	Martin Désiré	M	17		cultivator	Bonair
8	Altenhoven	Marie	F	14	yes		Rue du faubourg Saint-Nicolas
9	Anciaux	Euphrosine	F	85		pensioner	Place d'Armes and prison
10	Anciaux	Robert	M	32		police officer	Al' Bau
11	Andre	Marie	F	88		without profession	Bourdon Wall
12	Andrianne	Victor	M	59		janitor	Abbaye Notre-Dame de Leffe Plaza
13	Angot	Emile	M	48		threader	Tschoffen Wall
14	Ansotte	Hector	M	18		student	Abbaye Notre-Dame de Leffe Plaza or surroundings
15	Ares (Aeres)	Armand	M	33		carpenter	Abbaye Notre-Dame de Leffe Plaza or surroundings
16	Ares (Aeres)	Emile	M	66		pig farmer	Tschoffen Wall
17	Baclin	Jules	M	32		marble mason	Paper Mill
18	Bailly	Félix	M	41		employee	Place d'Armes and prison
19	Balleux	Félix	M	16 months	yes		Bourdon Wall
20	Banse	Gustave	M	30		weaver	Entrance to Fonds de Leffe
21	Bara(s)	Auguste	M	15		student	Bourdon Wall
22	Barre	Georges	M	55		employee	Collège communal
23	Barthelemy	Gustave	M	30		factory worker	Laurent Wall
24	Barthelemy	Jean-Baptiste	M	23		weaver	Laurent Wall
25	Barzin	Léopold	M	71		honorary deputy court clerk	Rue Saint-Pierre
26	Bastin	Herman	M	33		postal worker	Tschoffen Wall
27	Batteux	Marie	F	42		servant	Rue Grande
28	Bauduin	Edouard	M	42		employee	Tschoffen Wall
29	Baujot	Alfred	M	46		boatman	Bourdon Wall
30	Baujot	Maria	F	5	yes		Bourdon Wall
31	Baujot	Marthe	F	13	yes	schooler	Bourdon Wall
32	Baussart	Dieudonnée	F	78		housewife	Rue des Fossés
33	Bertulot	Ernest	M	48		marble mason	Pré Capelle
34	Betemps	Auguste	M	27		gardener	Bourdon Wall
35	Betemps	Maurice	M	19 months	yes		Bourdon Wall
36	Bietlot	Charles	M	76		without profession	Rue Saint-Pierre
37	Bietlot	Jean	M	40		brewery worker (warehouseman)	Abbaye Notre-Dame de Leffe Plaza or surroundings
38	Biname	Alphonse	M	37		cement manufacturer	Tschoffen Wall
39	Blanchard	Henri	M	48		weaver	Abbaye Notre-Dame de Leffe Plaza
40	Bon	Célestin	M	74		domestic	Abbaye Notre-Dame de Leffe Plaza
41	Bony (Frère Herman-Joseph)	Jean-Antoine	M	60		religious (convers)	Leffe (aqueduct)
42	Bouchat	Théophile	M	68		trader	Tienne d'Orsy
43	Bouche	Gustave	M	53		cobbler	Paper Mill
44	Bouille	Amand	M	36		blacksmith	Tschoffen Wall
45	Bourdon	Alexandre	M	74		trader	Bourdon Wall
46	Bourdon	Edmond	M	62		deputy court clerk	Bourdon Wall
47	Bourdon	Henri	M	17		student	Bourdon Wall
48	Bourdon	Jeanne -Henriette	F	33		seamstress	Bourdon Wall
49	Bourdon	Jeanne-Marie	F	13	yes	schooler	Bourdon Wall
50	Bourdon	Joseph	M	56		cabaretier	Rue Sax
51	Bourdon	Louis	M	39		cultivator	Neffe (aqueduct)
52	Bourguet	Eugène	M	30		journalist	Tschoffen Wall
53	Bourguignon	Clotilde	F	68		without profession	Bourdon Wall
54	Bourguignon	Edmond	M	16 months	yes		Neffe (aqueduct)
55	Bourguignon	Jean-Baptiste	M	29		truck driver	Neffe (aqueduct)
56	Bovy	Adèle	F	29		housewife	Rue Saint-Pierre
57	Bovy	Constant	M	23		automobile driver	Jardins du Casino
58	Bovy	Héloïse	F	23		factory worker	Rue Saint-Pierre
59	Bovy	Marcel	M	4	yes		Rue Saint-Pierre
60	Bradt	Julien	M	33		cobbler	Abbaye Notre-Dame de Leffe Plaza or surroundings
61	Brihaye	Alfred	M	25		hotel garçon	Impasse Saint-Roch
62	Broutoux	Emmanuel	M	54		employee mortgage office	Tschoffen Wall
63	Bulens	Alfred	M	26		threader	Abbaye Notre-Dame de Leffe Plaza
64	Bulens	Henri	M	53		threader	Paper Mill
65	Bulens	Louis	M	51		factory worker	Paper Mill
66	Bultot	Alexis	M	34		cultivator	Malaise Farm
67	Bultot	Alphonse	M	20		employee	Abbaye Notre-Dame de Leffe Plaza
68	Bultot	Camille	M	14	yes	weaver	Neffe (aqueduct)
69	Bultot	Emile	M	39		weaver	Abbaye Notre-Dame de Leffe Plaza
70	Bultot	Joseph	M	29		cultivator	Malaise Farm
71	Bultot	Jules	M	31		cultivator	Malaise Farm
72	Bultot	Léonie	F	39		housewife	Neffe (aqueduct)
73	Bultot	Norbert-Adelin	M	35		truck driver	Neffe (aqueduct)
74	Bultot	Norbert-Alfred	M	9	yes	schooler	Neffe (aqueduct)
75	Burnay	Zoé	F	22		housewife	Bourdon Wall
76	Burniaux	Ernest	M	36		clothes cutter	Neffe-Anseremme
77	Burton	Euphrasie	F	75		market gardener	Bourdon Wall
78	Calson	Alfred	M	61		carpenter	Paper Mill
79	Capelle	Joseph-Jean	M	62		cultivator	Pré Capelle
80	Capelle	Joseph-Martin	M	35		postage factor	Paper Mill
81	Carriaux	Charles	M	36		maneuver	Leffe (convent)
82	Cartigny	Henri	M	25		factory worker (terrassier)	Paper Mill
83	Cartigny	Hubert	M	53		marble mason	Pré Capelle
84	Cartigny	Léon	M	28		factory worker	Paper Mill
85	Casaquy	Auguste	M	49		journalist	Abbaye Notre-Dame de Leffe Plaza
86	Cassart	Alexis	M	17		factory worker	Laurent Wall
87	Cassart	Camille	M	?		factory worker	?
88	Cassart	François	M	36		factory worker	Paper Mill
89	Cassart	Hyacinthe	M	43		factory worker	Laurent Wall
90	Chabotier	Joseph	M	38		weaver	Tschoffen Wall
91	Chabotier	Jules	M	18		weaver	Tschoffen Wall
92	Chabotier	Louis	M	16		factory worker	Entrance to Fonds de Leffe
93	Charlier	Anna	F	15		without profession	Neffe (aqueduct)
94	Charlier	Auguste	M	56		valet parker	Rue des Basses Tanneries
95	Charlier	Georgette	F	9	yes	schooler	Neffe (aqueduct)
96	Charlier	Henri	M	40		weaver	Leffe (convent)
97	Charlier	Jules	M	35		journalist	Impasse Saint-Roch
98	Charlier	Maurice	M	16		employee to the railway	Neffe (aqueduct)
99	Charlier	Saturnin	M	40		store garçon	Neffe (aqueduct)
100	Charlier	Théodule	M	48		glassmaker	Tschoffen Wall
101	Charlot	Léon	M	25		weaver	Abbaye Notre-Dame de Leffe Plaza
102	Cletie	Léopold	M	32		security guard	Bourdon Wall
103	Colignon	Georges	M	16		weaver	Tschoffen Wall
104	Colignon	Joseph	M	46		weaver	Tschoffen Wall
105	Colignon	Lambert	M	43		dressmaker	Paper Mill
105	Colignon	Louis	M	38		weaver	Tschoffen Wall
107	Colignon	Victor	M	42		weaver	Rue du faubourg Saint-Nicolas
108	Colin	Auguste	M	60		mason	Rue Sax
109	Colin	Héloïse	F	75		without profession	Rue Grande
110	Collard	Emile	M	75		cobbler	Bourdon Wall
111	Collard	Florent	M	39		ceiling operator	Tschoffen Wall
112	Collard	Henri	M	37		ceiling operator	Tschoffen Wall
113	Collard	Joseph	M	77		former railway worker	Bourdon Wall
114	Colle	Camille	M	47		trader	Tschoffen Wall
115	Colle	Georges	M	19		student	Tschoffen Wall
116	Colle	Henri	M	22		house painter	Tschoffen Wall
117	Colle	Léon	M	16		student	Tschoffen Wall
118	Collignon	Arthur	M	16		weaver	Entrance to Fonds de Leffe
119	Collignon	Camille	M	30		weaver	Paper Mill
120	Collignon	Xavier	M	55		weaver	Entrance to Fonds de Leffe
121	Corbiau	Paul	M	61		renter	Tschoffen Wall
122	Corbisier	Frédéric	M	17		gas-plant fitter	Rue Saint-Pierre
123	Corbisier	Joseph	M	42		gas-plant fitter	Rue Saint-Pierre
124	Couillard	Armand	M	34		cabinetmaker	Tienne d'Orsy
125	Couillard	Auguste	M	71		cabinetmaker	Rue Saint-Jacques
126	Coupienne	Camille	M	32		baker	Rue Saint-Pierre
127	Coupienne	Emile	M	54		cobbler	Laurent Wall
128	Coupienne	Henri	M	38		rattacheur	Tschoffen Wall
129	Coupienne	Joseph-Camille	M	36		weaver	Abbaye Notre-Dame de Leffe Plaza
130	Coupienne	Joseph	M	58		cobbler	Rue Saint-Pierre
131	Coupienne	Victor	M	51		brewery worker	Leffe (convent)
132	Croin	Lambert	M	46		weaver	Abbaye Notre-Dame de Leffe Plaza
133	Culot	Edouard	M	59		trader	Tschoffen Wall
134	Culot	Florent	M	24		entrepreneur	Pré Capelle
135	Culot	Gustave	M	24		factory worker	Bourdon Wall
136	Culot	Henri	M	48		storekeeper	Bourdon Wall
137	Dachelet	Camille	M	20		domestic	Pré Capelle
138	Dachelet	Zéphyrin	M	17		domestic	Pré Capelle
139	Dandoy	Gustave	M	44		brewery worker	Tschoffen Wall
140	Darville	Arthur	M	26		employee	Entrance to Fonds de Leffe
141	Dasty	Désiré	M	74		renter	Neffe-Anseremme
142	Dauphin	Camille	M	18		weaver	Neffe-Dinant
143	Dauphin	Désiré	M	35		storekeeper	Neffe-Anseremme
144	Dauphin	Joséphine	F	20		weaver	Neffe-Dinant
145	Dauphin	Léopold	M	49		weaver	Neffe-Dinant
170	De Muyter	Constantin	M	60		storekeeper	Rue Saint-Pierre
146	Defays	Marie	F	54		housewife	Rue Saint-Pierre
147	Dehez	Sylvain	M	43		agent d'assurances	Paper Mill
148	Dehu	Victorien	M	48		journalist	Paper Mill
149	Delaey	Arthur	M	20		weaver	Abbaye Notre-Dame de Leffe Plaza
150	Delaey	Emile	M	24		weaver	Abbaye Notre-Dame de Leffe Plaza
151	Delaey	Camille-Alexis	M	23		rattacheur	Abbaye Notre-Dame de Leffe Plaza
152	Delaey	Camille-Antoine	M	48		weaver	Paper Mill
153	Delaey	Georges	M	16		rattacheur	Paper Mill
154	Delaey	Philippe	M	20		gas worker	Rue Saint-Pierre
155	Delaire	Marie	F	36		housewife	Rue Saint-Pierre
156	Delcourt	Louis	M	56		maneuver	Herbuchenne (?)
157	Delieux	Thérèse	F	38		housewife	Neffe (aqueduct)
158	Delimoy	Victorine	M	81		without profession	Neffe-Anseremme
159	Dellot	Charles	M	32		journalist	Impasse Saint-Roch
160	Dellot	Jules	M	29		journalist	Montagne de la Croix
161	Deloge	Alphonse	M	58		butcher	Abbaye Notre-Dame de Leffe Plaza
162	Deloge	Edmond	M	23		butcher	Abbaye Notre-Dame de Leffe Plaza
163	Deloge	Eugène	M	15		weaver	Abbaye Notre-Dame de Leffe Plaza
164	Deloge	Ferdinand	M	44		construction foreman	Abbaye Notre-Dame de Leffe Plaza
165	Delvaux	Henri	M	54		piano manufacturer	Alardo farm
166	Delvigne	Jules	M	48		carpenter	Abbaye Notre-Dame de Leffe Plaza or surroundings
167	Demillier	Arthur	M	24		hotel garçon	Saint-Médard
168	Demotie	Elisée	M	41		doucheur	Abbaye Notre-Dame de Leffe Plaza
169	Demotie	Modeste	M	45		weaver	Abbaye Notre-Dame de Leffe Plaza
171	Deskeuve	Jean	M	39		state roadmender	Bourdon Wall
172	Deskeuve	Marie	F	36		market gardener	Bourdon Wall
173	Dessy	Jules	M	38		storekeeper	Paper Mill
174	Detinne	Augustine	F	61		housewife	Rue des Fossés
175	Dewez	François	M	32		blacksmith	Pré Capelle
177	Didion	Callixte	M	20		hotel garçon	Saint-Médard
176	Diffrang	Emile	M	49		weaver	Bourdon Wall
178	Disy	Georges	M	34		weaver	Leffe (convent)
179	Disy	Jacques	M	55		journalist	Leffe (impasse St-Georges)
180	Disy	Julien	M	68		storekeeper	Tschoffen Wall
181	Disy	Luc	M	35		weaver	Abbaye Notre-Dame de Leffe Plaza or surroundings
182	Disy	Vital	M	48		weaver	Laurent Wall
183	Dobbeleer	Jules	M	36		confectioner	Impasse Saint-Roch
184	Dome	Adolphe	M	48		professor	Abbaye Notre-Dame de Leffe Plaza
185	Domine	Ernest	M	51		state roadmender	Bourdon Wall
187	Donnay	Léon	M	36		house painter	Abbaye Notre-Dame de Leffe Plaza
188	Donné	Camille	M	36		weaver	Paper Mill
186	Dony	Pierre-Joseph Adelin	M	70		janitor	Collège communal
189	Dubois	Joseph	M	62		journalist	Paper Mill
190	Dubois	Xavier	M	44		colporteur	Bourdon Wall
191	Duchene	Emile	M	49		mill fabric driver	Paper Mill
192	Duchene	Ernest	M	55		weaver	Abbaye Notre-Dame de Leffe Plaza or surroundings
193	Dufrenne	Renée	F	37		housewife	Neffe (aqueduct)
200	Dujeux	François	M	39		truck driver	Tschoffen Wall
194	Dumont	Clémentine	F	38		housewife	Bourdon Wall
195	Dupont	Joseph	M	8	yes	schooler	Bourdon Wall
196	Dupont	Léon	M	38		security guard	Bourdon Wall
197	Dupont	René	M	10	yes	schooler	Bourdon Wall
198	Dure	Léon	M	50		journalist	Bouvignes
199	Dury	Emile	M	49		cobbler	Bourdon Wall
201	Eliet	Arthur	M	56		weaver	Paper Mill
202	Eloy	Waldor	M	37		teacher	Pré Capelle
203	Englebert	Alexis	M	61		journalist	Malaise Farm
204	Englebert	Victor-Joseph	M	60		garçon-brewer	Paper Mill
205	Étienne	Auguste	M	23		valet parker	Bourdon Wall
206	Eugene	Emile	M	39		cultivator (domestic)	Mouchenne
207	Evrard	Jean-Baptiste	M	38		weaver	Paper Mill
208	Fabry	Albert	M	44		trader	Tschoffen Wall
209	Fallay	Jacques	M	44		trader	Abbaye Notre-Dame de Leffe Plaza or surroundings
210	Fastres	François	M	68		mason	Promenade de Meuse
211	Fastres	Odile	F	42		market gardener	Bourdon Wall
212	Fauconnier	Auguste	M	39		storekeeper	Tschoffen Wall
213	Fauconnier	Théophile	M	44		employee (Leffe factory)	Tschoffen Wall
214	Fauquet	Antoine-Zéphyrin	M	22		weaver	Abbaye Notre-Dame de Leffe Plaza
215	Fauquet	Louis	M	30		hairdresser	Abbaye Notre-Dame de Leffe Plaza
216	Fauquet	Théophile	M	52		weaver	Abbaye Notre-Dame de Leffe Plaza
217	Fecherolle	Henri	M	40		plombier	Tschoffen Wall
218	Fecherolle	Henri	M	46		weaver	Tschoffen Wall
219	Fecherolle	Joseph	M	33		weaver	Abbaye Notre-Dame de Leffe Plaza
220	Fecherolle	Marcel	M	17		weaver	Tschoffen Wall
221	Feret	Alphonse	M	38		valet parker	Laurent Wall
222	Feret	Louis	M	16		weaver	Laurent Wall
223	Ferre	Pierre	M	63		religious	Place de Meuse
224	Fevrier	Eugène	M	33		storekeeper	Impasse Saint-Roch
225	Fevrier	Georges	M	31		ouvrier tanneur	Tschoffen Wall
226	Fievet	Arnould	M	72		without profession	Devant-Bouvignes
227	Fievez	Auguste	M	59		house painter	Tschoffen Wall
228	Fievez	Camille	M	55		house painter	Rue Saint-Pierre
229	Finfe	Jean	M	23		factory worker	Tschoffen Wall
230	Finfe	Joseph	M	60		quarry worker	Tschoffen Wall
231	Finfe	Julien	M	32		weaver	Tschoffen Wall
232	Firmin	Alexis	M	19		dressmaker	Tschoffen Wall
233	FIRMIN	Joseph-Léon	M	43		dressmaker	Montagne de la Croix
234	Firmin	Joseph	M	16		apprenti-mechanic	Tschoffen Wall
235	Firmin	Léon	M	18		typographer (dressmaker)	Tschoffen Wall
236	Fisetie	Camille	M	50		trader	Tschoffen Wall
237	Fivet	Auguste	M	36		accountant	Tschoffen Wall
238	Fivet	Ferdinand	M	25		cabinetmaker	Bourdon Wall
239	Fivet	Mariette	F	3 weeks	yes		Bourdon Wall
240	Flostroy	Emile	M	31		baker	Tschoffen Wall
241	Fondaire	Ernest	M	46		stone mason	Paper Mill
242	Fondaire	Marcel	M	14	yes		Paper Mill
243	Fondaire	Pauline	F	18		factory worker	Fonds de Leffe
244	Fondaire	Robert	M	16		weaver	Paper Mill
245	Fonder	François	M	62		trader	Abbaye Notre-Dame de Leffe Plaza or surroundings
246	Fonder	Jean-Baptiste	M	31		architecte	Tschoffen Wall
247	Fontaine	Désiré	M	32		pianiste	Laurent Wall
248	Gaudinne	Alphonse	M	47		mason	Bourdon Wall
249	Gaudinne	Edouard	M	24		carpenter	Abbaye Notre-Dame de Leffe Plaza
250	Gaudinne	François	M	54		carpenter	Paper Mill
251	Gaudinne	Florent	M	7	yes	schooler	Bourdon Wall
252	Gaudinne	Joseph	M	71		drainer	Herbuchenne
253	Gaudinne	Jules	M	16		carpenter	Paper Mill
254	Gaudinne	René	M	18			Quartier de « La Dinantaise »
255	Gelinne	Georges	M	27		dressmaker (railway worker)	Tschoffen Wall
256	Gelinne	Gustave	M	28		bodybuilder	Tschoffen Wall
257	Genet	Alfred	M	35		cook	Tschoffen Wall
258	Genon	Gilda	M	19 months	yes		Bourdon Wall
259	Genot	Félicien	M	64		iron turner	Leffe (convent)
260	Georges	Adelin	M	34		carpenter	La « Cité »
261	Georges	Alexandre	M	36		carpenter	Montagne de la Croix
262	Georges	Alfred	M	36		weaver	Paper Mill
263	Georges	Amand	H	53		employee	Leffe (convent)
264	Georges	Apolline	F	54		housewife	Neffe-Dinant
265	Georges	Auguste	M	58		chauffeur to the gas factory	Rue Saint-Pierre
266	Georges	Auguste	M	39		dressmaker	Place d'Armes and prison
267	Georges	Camille	M	36		baker	Abbaye Notre-Dame de Leffe Plaza
268	Georges	Henri	M	68		locksmith	Entrance to Fonds de Leffe
269	Georges	Joseph	M	44		weaver	Entrance to Fonds de Leffe
270	Georges	Louis	M	28		employee	Abbaye Notre-Dame de Leffe Plaza
271	Geudvert	Albert	M	17		weaver	Paper Mill
272	Geudvert	Emile	M	54		cobbler	Paper Mill
273	Giaux	Victor	M	49		carpenter	Abbaye Notre-Dame de Leffe Plaza
274	Gillain	Alfred	M	64		mechanic	Rue des Basses Tanneries
275	Gillain	Robert	M	14	yes	weaver	Neffe-Dinant
276	Gillet	Jules	M	28		marble mason	Tschoffen Wall
277	Gillet	Omer	M	45		blacksmith	Bouvignes
278	Goard	François	M	60		without profession	Abbaye Notre-Dame de Leffe Plaza
279	Goard	Marie-Louise	F	5	yes		Rue Grande (?)
280	Godain	Clément	M	48		sand moulder	Tschoffen Wall
281	Godinne	Georges	M	17		journalist	Paper Mill
282	Goffaux	Marcel	M	18		rattacheur	Paper Mill
283	Goffaux	Pierre	M	48		factory worker	Paper Mill
284	Goffin	Eugène	M	47		brewery worker	Tschoffen Wall
285	Goffin	Eugène	M	15		domestic	Entrance to Fonds de Leffe
286	Gonze	François	M	25		carpenter	Abbaye Notre-Dame de Leffe Plaza or surroundings
287	Gonze	Léopold	M	65		cobbler	Paper Mill
288	Grandjean	Désiré	M	56		charpentier	Fonds de Leffe
289	Grenier	Joseph	M	46		journalist	Abbaye Notre-Dame de Leffe Plaza or surroundings
290	Grigniet	François	M	26		employee	Tschoffen Wall
291	Guerry	Joseph	M	31		employee (district police station)	Neffe-Anseremme
292	Guillaume	Charles	M	38		trader	Fonds des Pèlerins
293	Guillaume	Emile	M	44		teacher	Abbaye Notre-Dame de Leffe Plaza
294	Gustin	Edmond	M	10	yes	schooler	Neffe (aqueduct)
295	Gustin	Marguerite	F	20		seamstress	Neffe (aqueduct)
296	Habran	Emile	M	31		cooper	Paper Mill
297	Halloy	Gustave	M	48		mason	Herbuchenne
298	Hamblenne	Catherine	F	51		housewife	Bourdon Wall
299	Hamblenne	Hubert	M	45		carpenter	Entrance to Fonds de Leffe
300	Hansen	Alexis	M	54		maneuver	Impasse Saint-Georges
301	Hardy	Edouard	M	50		weaver	Neffe-Dinant
302	Hardy	Octave	M	39		basket maker	Neffe-Dinant
303	Hastir	Thérèse	F	80		housewife	La « Cité »
304	Haustenne	Emile	M	30		quarry worker	Abbaye Notre-Dame de Leffe Plaza or surroundings
305	Hauteclaire	Henri	M	44		quarry worker	Herbuchenne
306	Hautot	Emile	M	30		cultivator	Herbuchenne (Alardo farm)
307	Hautot	Joseph	M	34		cultivator	Près de Bonair
308	Henenne	René	M	21		weaver	Rocher Bayard
309	Hennuy	Alexis	M	43		weaver	Entrance to Fonds de Leffe
310	Hennuy	Georges	M	14	yes	factory worker	Entrance to Fonds de Leffe
311	Hennuy	Gustave	M	36		weaver	Entrance to Fonds de Leffe
312	Hennuy	Jules	M	18		weaver	Abbaye Notre-Dame de Leffe Plaza or surroundings
313	Hennuy	Marcel	M	15		weaver	Entrance to Fonds de Leffe
314	Henrion	Alphonse	M	41		weaver	Abbaye Notre-Dame de Leffe Plaza or surroundings
315	Henry	Camille	M	30		factory worker	Devant-Bouvignes
316	Henry	Désiré	M	27		threader	Abbaye Notre-Dame de Leffe Plaza or surroundings
317	Herman	Alphonse	M	48		house painter	Rue Saint-Jacques
318	Herman	Joseph	M	29		journalist	Paper Mill
319	Herman	Juliette	F	13	yes	schooler	Neffe-Anseremme
320	Hiernaux	Jules	M	41		confectioner (baker)	Laurent Wall
321	Himmer	Remy	M	65		factory manager	Abbaye Notre-Dame de Leffe Plaza
322	Hopiard	Emile	M	29		commerce employee	Tschoffen Wall
323	Hotielet	Arthur	M	36		factory worker	Paper Mill
324	Houbion	Eugène	M	76		boatman	Rocher Bayard
325	Houbion	Jules	M	50		cooper	Sœurs de la Charité
326	Huberland	Camille	M	28		employee	Tschoffen Wall
327	Hubert	Octave	M	36		police officer	Tschoffen Wall
328	Hubin	Emile	M	77		ceiling operator	Rue Saint-Pierre
339	Jacqmain	Auguste	M	51		dressmaker	Entrance to Fonds de Leffe
329	Jacquet	Alexandre	M	66		weaver	Leffe (convent)
330	Jacquet	Camille	M	29		weaver	Paper Mill
331	Jacquet	Gaston	M	41		baker	Rue Saint-Pierre
332	Jacquet	Gustave-Edmond	M	63		miller	Pré Capelle
333	Jacquet	Gustave	M	23		cultivator	Pré Capelle
334	Jacquet	Henri	M	55		valet parker (weaver)	Paper Mill
335	Jacquet	Joseph	M	45		garde-chasse	Montagne de la Croix
336	Jacquet	Jules	M	65		traveling salesman	Tschoffen Wall
337	Jacquet	Louis	M	36		weaver	Abbaye Notre-Dame de Leffe Plaza or surroundings
338	Jacquet	Victor	M	60		factory worker	Paper Mill
340	Jassogne	Léon	M	26		cobbler	Tschoffen Wall
341	Jassogne	Théodorine	F	27		factory worker	Aux Caracolles
342	Jaumaux	Camille	M	44		weaver	Abbaye Notre-Dame de Leffe Plaza
343	Jaumaux	Georges	M	18		factory worker	Abbaye Notre-Dame de Leffe Plaza
344	Jaumot	Alexandre	M	36		journalist	Tschoffen Wall
345	Junius	Joseph	M	43		mechanic	Abbaye Notre-Dame de Leffe Plaza or surroundings
346	Junius	Prosper	M	51		professor	Laurent Wall
347	Kestemont	François	M	21		café garçon	Tschoffen Wall
348	Kinif	Joseph	M	61		baker	Rue Saint-Pierre
349	Kinique	Edmond	M	57		storekeeper	Bourdon Wall
350	Kinique	Joseph	M	19		diamond dealer	Bourdon Wall
351	Kinique	Jules	M	13	yes	student	Bourdon Wall
352	Kinique	Louise	F	21		housewife	Bourdon Wall
353	Laffut	Isidore	M	61		construction foreman	Abbaye Notre-Dame de Leffe Plaza or surroundings
354	Laforet	Adolphe	M	23		weaver	Abbaye Notre-Dame de Leffe Plaza
355	Laforet	Alphonse	M	34		weaver	Tschoffen Wall
356	Laforet	Camille-Alphonse	M	55		brewery worker	Abbaye Notre-Dame de Leffe Plaza
357	Laforet	Camille-Victor	M	18		brewery worker	Abbaye Notre-Dame de Leffe Plaza
358	Laforet	Joseph	M	37		weaver	Abbaye Notre-Dame de Leffe Plaza
359	Laforet	Xavier	M	31		brewery worker	Abbaye Notre-Dame de Leffe Plaza
360	Lagneau	Ernest	M	67		factory worker	Bourdon Wall
361	Lahaye	Eugène	M	47		baker	Laurent Wall
362	Lahaye	Joseph	M	55		baker	Leffe (convent)
363	Laloux	Charlotte	F	32		housewife	Neffe (aqueduct)
364	Laloux	Victor-Lambert	M	76		stone mason	Abbaye Notre-Dame de Leffe Plaza or surroundings
365	Lamand	Marie	F	31		housewife	Abbaye Notre-Dame de Leffe Plaza or surroundings
366	Lambert	François	M	45		weaver	Tschoffen Wall
367	Lambert	Victor	M	43		truck driver (brewer)	Impasse Saint-Roch
368	Lamberty	Louis	M	32		cooper	Tschoffen Wall
369	Lamour	Emile	M	27		cabinetmaker	Rue Saint-Pierre
370	Laurent	Joseph	M	56		trader	Abbaye Notre-Dame de Leffe Plaza
371	Laurent	Marie	F	57		journalist	Saint-Médard
372	Laverge	Mélanie	F	38		housewife	Impasse Saint-Roch
373	Lebrun	Alphonse	M	33		dressmaker	Tschoffen Wall
374	Lebrun	Henri	M	48		postal worker	Bourdon Wall
375	Lebrun	Joseph-François	M	19		dressmaker	Place d'Armes and prison
376	Lebrun	Joseph	M	59		journalist	Impasse Saint-Roch
377	Leclerc	Olivier	M	53		cultivator	Pré Capelle
378	Leclerc	Pierre	M	25		cultivator	Pré Capelle
379	Lecocq	Louis	M	53		organist	Tschoffen Wall
380	Lecomte	Joséphine	F	73		housewife	Bourdon Wall
381	Ledent	Gilles	M	29		terrassier	Rocher Bayard
382	Legros	Marie	F	51		trader	Place d'Armes and prison
383	Lejeune	Charles	M	20		wood turner	Abbaye Notre-Dame de Leffe Plaza
384	Lemaire	Camille	M	17		butcher	Impasse Saint-Roch
385	Lemaire	Jean	M	41		dressmaker	Tschoffen Wall
386	Lemaire	Jules	M	42		butcher	Tschoffen Wall
387	Lemer	Charles	M	13	yes	schooler	Anseremme (Brasserie)
388	Lemer	François	M	53		ceiling operator	Tschoffen Wall
389	Lemineur	Joséphine	F	72		without profession	Aux Caracolles
390	Lemineur	Jules	M	44		locksmith	Tschoffen Wall
391	Lempereur	Jeanne	F	16		telephonist	Neffe-Anseremme
392	Lenain	Théodule-Jean-Joseph	M	40		construction foreman (Leffe factory)	Abbaye Notre-Dame de Leffe Plaza or surroundings
393	Lenain	Théodule	M	17		employee	Abbaye Notre-Dame de Leffe Plaza or surroundings
394	Lenel	Auguste	M	21		hairdresser	Tschoffen Wall
395	Lenoir	Victor	M	58		journalist	Saint-Médard
396	Leonard	Françoise	F	25		housewife	Bourdon Wall
397	Lepage	Camille	M	53		valet parker (domestic)	Tschoffen Wall
398	Lepas	Louise	F	16		factory worker	Saint-Médard
399	Libert	Léon	M	21		factory worker	Dry les Wennes
400	Libert	Nestor	M	30		pig farmer	Entrance to Fonds de Leffe
401	Limet	Jules	M	46		weaver	Leffe (rue St-Georges)
402	Lion	Alexis	M	41		house painter	Abbaye Notre-Dame de Leffe Plaza
403	Lion	Amand	M	63		clockmaker	Rue Sax
404	Lion	Arthur	M	26		weaver	Abbaye Notre-Dame de Leffe Plaza or surroundings
405	Lion	Charles	M	40		dressmaker	Rue Saint-Pierre
406	Lion	Joseph	M	28		traveling salesman	Abbaye Notre-Dame de Leffe Plaza
407	Lion	Joseph	M	69		typographer	Rue Saint-Pierre
408	Lion	Jules	M	27		clockmaker	Rue Sax
409	Lissoir	Camille	M	33		butcher (cooper)	Entrance to Fonds de Leffe
410	Lissoir	Pierre	M	71		cultivator	Entrance to Fonds de Leffe
411	Longville	Félix	M	63		police commissioner	Rue Saint-Pierre
412	Looze	Marie	F	43		housewife	Bourdon Wall
413	Louis	Benjamin	M	15		weaver	Laurent Wall
414	Louis	Désiré	M	55		construction foreman	Abbaye Notre-Dame de Leffe Plaza
415	Louis	Désiré	M	20		employee	Abbaye Notre-Dame de Leffe Plaza
416	Louis	Vital	M	18		factory worker	Abbaye Notre-Dame de Leffe Plaza
417	Louis	Xavier	M	51		construction foreman (Leffe factory)	Laurent Wall
418	Lupsin	Alphonse	M	59		quarry worker	Abbaye Notre-Dame de Leffe Plaza
419	Maillen	Marie-Thérèse	F	42		trader	Hauteurs de la rive droite
420	Manteau	Edmond	M	70		cabaretier	Impasse Saint-Roch
421	Maquet	Elvire	F	22		factory worker	Aux Caracolles
422	Marchal	Camille	M	44		weaver	Leffe (convent)
423	Marchal	Henri	M	18		dressmaker	Abbaye Notre-Dame de Leffe Plaza
424	Marchal	Jules	M	47		storekeeper	Abbaye Notre-Dame de Leffe Plaza
425	Marchal	Michel	M	50		dressmaker	Abbaye Notre-Dame de Leffe Plaza
426	Marchot	Gilda	F	2	yes		Bourdon Wall
427	Marchot	Joseph	M	46		wheelwright	Bourdon Wall
428	Maretie	Hubert	M	38		employee	Abbaye Notre-Dame de Leffe Plaza
429	Maretie	Joseph	M	42		construction foreman	Abbaye Notre-Dame de Leffe Plaza or surroundings
430	Marine	Joseph	M	55		brewery worker	Montagne de la Croix
431	Marlier	Flore	F	58		greengrocer	Rue des Fossés
432	Marsigny	Madeleine	F	22		without profession	Les Rivages
433	Martin	Alphonse	M	62		farm domestic	Herbuchenne
434	Martin	Henriette	F	19		factory worker	Bourdon Wall
435	Martin	Joseph	M	23		factory worker	Bourdon Wall
436	Martin	Marie	F	17		factory worker	Bourdon Wall
437	Martin	Pierre	M	60		knifemaker	Bourdon Wall
438	Masson	Camille	M	42		construction foreman (Leffe factory)	Abbaye Notre-Dame de Leffe Plaza
439	Masson	Victor	M	39		construction foreman (Leffe factory)	Abbaye Notre-Dame de Leffe Plaza
440	Matagne	Clotilde	F	71		without profession	Neffe-Anseremme
441	Materne	Jules	M	70		market gardener	Rue Saint-Jacques
442	Mathieu	Emile	M	51		mechanic	Abbaye Notre-Dame de Leffe Plaza
443	Mathieux	Auguste	M	67		commissionnaire	Tschoffen Wall
444	Mathieux	Eugène	M	69		brewery worker	Rue Saint-Pierre
445	Mathieux	François	M	23		dressmaker	Tschoffen Wall
446	Maudoux	Armand	M	46		gluer	Abbaye Notre-Dame de Leffe Plaza or surroundings
447	Maurer	Octave	M	31		brewery worker	Tschoffen Wall
448	Maury	Alphonse	M	48		blacksmith	Tschoffen Wall
449	Mazy	Antoine	M	49		carpenter	Fonds de Leffe
450	Mazy	Joseph-Julien	M	55		brewery worker	Tschoffen Wall
451	Mazy	Lucien	M	26		weaver	Malaise Farm
452	Mazy	Ulysse	M	41		dressmaker	Paper Mill
453	Menu	Hubert	M	39		longshoreman	Impasse Saint-Roch
454	Mercenier	Nicolas	M	72		domestic	Collège communal
455	Meura	Alfred	M	40		cobbler	Tschoffen Wall
456	Meurat	Emile	M	7	yes	schooler	Neffe (aqueduct)
457	Meurat	Eva	F	6	yes	schooler	Neffe (aqueduct)
458	Meurat	Victor	M	2.5	yes		Neffe (aqueduct)
459	Meurisse	Marcelline	F	59		housewife	Rocher Bayard
461	Michel	Emile	M	27		dressmaker	Rue Saint-Pierre
462	Michel	Hyacinthe	M	57		journalist	La « Cité »
463	Michel	Jules	M	39		storekeeper	Abbaye Notre-Dame de Leffe Plaza
464	Michel	Lambert	M	63		baker	Abbaye Notre-Dame de Leffe Plaza
465	Michel	Léon-Victor	M	36		employee	Abbaye Notre-Dame de Leffe Plaza
466	Michel	Léon-Louis	M	49		rag merchant	Au Couret
470	Migeotte	Adolphe	M	62		cultivator	Paper Mill
471	Migeotte	Alphonse	M	15		rattacheur	Paper Mill
472	Migeotte	Camille	M	19		weaver	Paper Mill
473	Migeotte	Constant	M	14	yes		Paper Mill
474	Migeotte	Emile	M	32		valet parker (pig farmer)	Paper Mill
475	Migeotte	Henri	H	16		rattacheur	Paper Mill
476	Migeotte	Louis	M	50		threader	Paper Mill
467	Milcamps	Jules	M	36		assistant clerk	Abbaye Notre-Dame de Leffe Plaza or surroundings
468	Milcamps	Lucien	M	68		former lock keeper	Abbaye Notre-Dame de Leffe Plaza or surroundings
469	Minet	Marie	F	45		housewife	Bourdon Wall
460	MlChat	Andrée	F	3	yes		Place d'Armes and prison
477	Modave	Nestor	M	40		cultivator	Pré Capelle
478	Monard	Jules	M	79		renter	Pont d'Amour
479	Monin	Alphonse	M	14	yes	weaver	Entrance to Fonds de Leffe
480	Monin	Arthur	M	25		weaver	Laurent Wall
481	Monin	Charles	M	26		factory worker	Paper Mill
482	Monin	Eugène	M	19		factory worker	Laurent Wall
483	Monin	Félix	M	53		threader	Paper Mill
484	Monin	Fernand	M	55		trader	Place de Meuse
485	Monin	Jean-Baptiste	M	47		weaver	Abbaye Notre-Dame de Leffe Plaza or surroundings
486	Monin	Henri	M	28		factory worker	Paper Mill
487	Monin	Hyacinthe	M	53		weaver	Laurent Wall
488	Monin	Jules	M	40		brewer	Laurent Wall
489	Monin	Nicolas	M	56		baker	Neffe (aqueduct)
490	Monin	Pierre	M	27		weaver	Paper Mill
494	Monty	Alexandre	M	39		re-mortar	Paper Mill
495	Morelle	Joseph	M	69		charron	Bourdon Wall
496	Morelle	Jules	M	17		student	Bourdon Wall
497	Morelle	Marguerite	F	11	yes	schooler	Bourdon Wall
498	Mossiat	Frédéric	M	27		confectioner	Tschoffen Wall
499	Mossiat	Jules	M	38		sommelier	Tschoffen Wall
500	Mosty	Eugène	M	58		brewery worker	Laurent Wall
501	Moussoux	Léon	M	55		hotelier	Rue Saint-Jacques
491	Mouton	Jules	M	48		trader	Abbaye Notre-Dame de Leffe Plaza
492	Mouton	Justine	F	76		housewife	Neffe-Anseremme
493	Mouton	René	M	19		employee	Paper Mill
502	Naus	Charles	M	57		mechanic	Leffe (rue Longue)
503	Naus	Joséphine	F	67		housewife	Rue Saint-Pierre
504	Nepper	Emile-Thomas	M	16		student	Paper Mill
505	Nepper	Emile	M	41		butcher	Tschoffen Wall
506	Nepper	Louis	M	42		cultivator	Paper Mill
507	Neuret	Auguste	M	22		weaver	Tschoffen Wall
508	Nicaise	Gustave	M	77		renter	Laurent Wall
509	Nicaise	Léon	M	75		renter	Laurent Wall
510	Ninite	Nelly	F	24		housewife	Les Rivages
511	Noel	Alexandre	M	40		ceiling operator	Laurent Wall
512	Ory	Louis-Joseph	M	27		baker	Tschoffen Wall
514	Pairoux	Alfred	M	45		butcher	Tschoffen Wall
513	Panier	Fernand	M	38		pharmacist	Tschoffen Wall
515	Paquet	Armand-Joseph	M	30		boilermaker (labourer)	Paper Mill
516	Paquet	Armand-François	M	27		wood turner	Abbaye Notre-Dame de Leffe Plaza or surroundings
517	Paquet	Émilie	F	76		housewife	Indéterminé
518	Paquet	Floris	M	22		threader	Dry les Wennes
519	Paquet	Louis	M	34		pharmacist	Tschoffen Wall
520	Paquet	Marie	F	37		housewife	Bourdon Wall
521	Paquet	Marie-Joséphine	F	19		without profession	Bourdon Wall
522	Patard	Marie	F	57		housewife	Neffe-Anseremme
523	Patigny	Jean-Baptiste	M	43		truck driver	Tschoffen Wall
524	Patigny	Henri	M	47		hotel garçon	Tschoffen Wall
525	Pecasse	Florent	M	56		weaver (tannery worker)	Entrée des Fonds de Leffe
526	Pecasse	Hermance	F	38		store manager	Rue Grande
527	Pecasse	Joseph	M	38		quarry worker	Rue du faubourg Saint-Nicolas
528	Peduzy	Joseph	M	50		cooper	Tschoffen Wall
529	Perez Villazo	Vicente	M	20		domestic (cook)	Collège communal
530	Perreu	Nicolas-Urbain	M	40		religious	Leffe (aqueduct)
531	Petit	Joseph	M	17		factory worker	La « Cité »
532	Petit	Noël	M	12	yes		La « Cité »
533	Philippart	Jean	M	59		clothes cutter	Tschoffen Wall
534	Pierard	Olivier	M	67		renter	Tschoffen Wall
535	Pierre	Adrien-Joseph	M	73		journalist	Abbaye Notre-Dame de Leffe Plaza or surroundings
536	Pietie	Adrien-Victor	M	20		traveling salesman	Leffe (impasse St-Georges)
537	Pietie	Joseph	M	45		baker	Abbaye Notre-Dame de Leffe Plaza or surroundings
538	Pinsmaille	Adèle	F	44		market gardener (seamstress)	Bourdon Wall
539	Pinsmaille	Charles	M	34		typographer	Quartier de « La Dinantaise »
540	Pinsmaille	Marie	F	49		housewife	Bourdon Wall
542	Pire	Antoine	M	21		weaver	Entrance to Fonds de Leffe
543	Pire	Emile	M	53		weaver	Entrance to Fonds de Leffe
544	Piret	Joseph	M	47		factory worker	Paper Mill
545	Piret	Victor	M	63		postal worker	Abbaye Notre-Dame de Leffe Plaza
546	Pirlot	Félicie	F	67		market gardener	Bourdon Wall
547	Pirot	Joseph	M	38		quilter	Tschoffen Wall
548	Pirson	Alexandre	M	52		brewery worker	Devant-Bouvignes
549	Pirson	Narcisse	M	47		postal worker	Route de Namur
541	Pl Raux	Adelin	M	32		cattle merchant	Pré Capelle
550	Polita	Joachim	M	32		carpenter	Abbaye Notre-Dame de Leffe Plaza
551	Polita	Léon	M	37		weaver	Abbaye Notre-Dame de Leffe Plaza or surroundings
552	Pollet	Auguste	M	43		market gardener (carrier)	Bourdon Wall
553	Pollet	Edouard	M	15		weaver	Neffe (aqueduct)
554	Pollet	Eugénie	F	36		seamstress	Bourdon Wall
555	Pollet	Louise	F	46		housewife	Bourdon Wall
556	Pollet	Nelly	F	12 months	yes		Bourdon Wall
557	Poncelet	Gustave	M	22		gas worker	Abbaye Notre-Dame de Leffe Plaza
558	Poncelet	Henri	M	61		journalist	Abbaye Notre-Dame de Leffe Plaza
559	Poncelet	Henriette	F	54		housewife	Bourdon Wall
560	Poncelet	Pierre	M	32		weaver	Abbaye Notre-Dame de Leffe Plaza or surroundings
561	Poncelet	Victor	M	41		industriel (dinandier)	Leffe (rue Longue)
562	Poncin	Jules	M	48		stone mason	Rue de la Grêle
563	Ponthieux	François	M	84		gardener	Indéterminé
564	Prignon	Octave	M	40		municipal collector	Abbaye Notre-Dame de Leffe Plaza or surroundings
565	Questiaux	Ferdinand	M	51		weaver	Paper Mill
566	Quoilin	Anselme	M	53		employee	Laurent Wall
567	Quoilin	Anselme	M	28		employee	Abbaye Notre-Dame de Leffe Plaza
568	Quoilin	Désiré	M	59		construction foreman	Abbaye Notre-Dame de Leffe Plaza
569	Quoilin	Fernand	M	33		employee	Abbaye Notre-Dame de Leffe Plaza
570	Quoilin	Joseph	M	56		construction foreman	Abbaye Notre-Dame de Leffe Plaza or surroundings
571	Rase	Emma	F	50		without profession	Bourdon Wall
572	Rasseneux	Léopoldine	F	19		factory worker	Abbaye Notre-Dame de Leffe Plaza or surroundings
573	Ravet	François-Eugène	M	50		entrepreneur (carpenter)	Paper Mill
574	Ravet	François-Albert	M	37		wood turner	Abbaye Notre-Dame de Leffe Plaza or surroundings
575	Ravet	Joseph	M	39		wood turner	Abbaye Notre-Dame de Leffe Plaza or surroundings
576	Remacle	Victor	M	68		journalist	Fonds de Leffe
577	Remy	Eudore	M	39		medic	Rue Sax
578	Renard	Albert	M	27		pig farmer	Tschoffen Wall
579	Rifflart	Nestor	M	55		weaver	Abbaye Notre-Dame de Leffe Plaza or surroundings
580	Roba	Simon-Joseph	M	48		deputy commissioner of police	Tschoffen Wall
581	Rodrigue	Jean	M	5 months	yes		Les Rivages
582	Rolin	Jules	M	43		employee (croupier)	Bourdon Wall
583	Romain	Camille	M	40		commissionnaire	Impasse Saint-Roch
584	Romain	Henri	M	30		farm worker	Impasse Saint-Roch
585	Ronv(E)Aux	Emile	M	66		carpenter	Paper Mill
586	Ronv(E)Aux	Joseph	M	38		carpenter	Abbaye Notre-Dame de Leffe Plaza or surroundings
587	Roucoux	Edmond	M	17		cobbler	Impasse Saint-Roch
588	Roucoux	Maurice	M	16		weaver	Impasse Saint-Roch
589	Rouelle	Marcelline	F	40		housewife	Rue Saint-Jacques
590	Rouffiange	Charles	M	68		mason	Entrance to Fonds de Leffe
591	Rouffiange	Désiré	M	32		weaver	Paper Mill
592	Roulin	Germaine	F	20		lingerie	Neffe-Anseremme
593	Roulin	Henriette	F	12	yes	schooler	Neffe-Anseremme
594	Roulin	Joseph	M	23		storekeeper	Bourdon Wall
595	Sanglier	Joseph	M	37		employee (factory worker)	Abbaye Notre-Dame de Leffe Plaza
596	Sarazin	Hortense	F	59		housewife	Entrance to Fonds de Leffe
597	Sauvage	Auguste	M	22		employee	Impasse Saint-Roch
598	Sauvage	Joseph	M	28		weaver	Impasse Saint-Roch
599	Schelbach	Jules	M	59		bourrelier	Les Rivages
600	Schram	Arthur	M	28		weaver	Pont d'Amour
601	Schram	Egide	M	64		wood turner	Pont d'Amour
602	Seguin	Jules	M	67		weaver	Abbaye Notre-Dame de Leffe Plaza
603	Seha	Vital	M	59		dressmaker	Neffe (aqueduct)
604	Servais	Adolphe	M	63		former municipal secretary	Abbaye Notre-Dame de Leffe Plaza
605	Servais	Georges	M	26		cabinetmaker	Abbaye Notre-Dame de Leffe Plaza
606	Servais	Léon	M	23		baker	Abbaye Notre-Dame de Leffe Plaza
607	Servais	Louis	M	18		wood turner	Abbaye Notre-Dame de Leffe Plaza
608	Serville	Guillaume	M	51		farm domestic	Rondchêne
609	Sibret	Alfred	M	18		cultivator	Rue Saint-Jacques
610	Simon	Auguste	M	22		basket maker	Place Saint-Nicolas
611	Simon	Étienne	M	78		renter	Laurent Wall
612	Simon	Florian	M	39		factory worker	Abbaye Notre-Dame de Leffe Plaza
613	Simon	Léon	M	55		house painter	Tienne d'Orsy
614	Simonet	Arthur	M	47		employee (weaver)	Abbaye Notre-Dame de Leffe Plaza
615	Simonet	Félix	M	72		renter	Laurent Wall
616	Sinzot	Léon	M	43		railway worker	Laurent Wall
617	Solbrun	Elie	M	40		valet parker (baker)	Rue Saint-Pierre
618	Somme	Adelin	M	25		electrician	Tschoffen Wall
619	Somme	Constant	M	39		carpenter	Tschoffen Wall
620	Somme	Grégoire	M	48		cobbler	Tschoffen Wall
621	Somme	Hyacinthe	M	26		baker	Tschoffen Wall
622	Somme	Léon	M	18		electrician	Tschoffen Wall
623	Soree	Vital	M	15		factory worker	Tschoffen Wall
624	Sovet	Emile	M	32		cook	Bourdon Wall
625	Struvay	Claire	F	2	oui		Bourdon Wall
626	Struvay	René	M	11	yes	schooler	Bourdon Wall
627	Taton	Ferdinande	F	62		housewife	Rue Saint-Jacques
628	Texhy	Joseph	M	39		weaver	Abbaye Notre-Dame de Leffe Plaza or surroundings
629	Thianche	Désiré	M	30		warehouseman (foundry worker)	Tschoffen Wall
630	Thibaux	Maurice-Edmond	M	15		student	Abbaye Notre-Dame de Leffe Plaza or surroundings
631	Thirifays	Marie-Thérèse-Adèle	F	57		without profession	Leffe
632	Thirifays	Lambert	M	33		renter	Impasse Saint-Roch
633	Thomas	Joseph	M	33		baker	Leffe (convent)
634	Toussaint	Céline	F	33		housewife	Neffe (aqueduct)
635	Toussaint	Joseph	M	56		weaver	Tschoffen Wall
636	Toussaint	Louis	M	32		gluer	Abbaye Notre-Dame de Leffe Plaza or surroundings
637	Toussaint	Marie	F	66		housewife	Pont d'Amour
638	Toussaint	Victor	M	24		fountain engineer	Impasse Saint-Roch
639	Trinteler	Eugène	M	47		fish merchant	Place de Meuse
640	Van Buggenhout	Jean	M	37		concrete worker	Abbaye Notre-Dame de Leffe Plaza
641	Vandeputie	Henriette	F	21		servant	Bouvignes
642	Vanderhaegen	Arthur	M	36		weaver	Bourdon Wall
643	Vanheden	Pauline	F	55		trader	Place de Meuse
644	Vaugin	Augustin-Arille	M	64		pig farmer	Impasse Saint-Roch
645	Verenne	Arthur-Antoine	M	24		weaver	Entrance to Fonds de Leffe
646	Verenne	Arthur-Gilles	M	48		valet parker	Tschoffen Wall
647	Verenne	Marcel	M	17		cabinetmaker	Impasse Saint-Roch
648	Verenne	Georges	M	20		employee	Tschoffen Wall
649	Vilain	Alexandre	M	40		trader	Rue Saint-Jacques
650	Vilain	Fernand	M	34		professor de musique	Tschoffen Wall
651	Vinstock	Fernand	M	25		weaver	Tschoffen Wall
652	Vinstock	Frédéric	M	57		valet parker	Tschoffen Wall
653	Vinstock	Jules	M	15		student	Tschoffen Wall
654	Vinstock	Louis	M	19		weaver	Neffe-Dinant
655	Warnant	Alzir	M	34		journalist	Paper Mill
656	Warnant	Félix	M	24		journalist	Paper Mill
657	Warnant	Pierre	M	24		showman	Leffe (impasse St-Georges)
658	Warnant	Urbain	M	30		journalist	Paper Mill
659	Wartique	Rachel	F	20		without profession	Neffe-Anseremme
660	Warzee	Octave	M	47		construction foreman	Bourdon Wall
661	Wasseige	Jacques	M	19		student	Tschoffen Wall
662	Wasseige	Pierre	M	20		employee	Tschoffen Wall
663	Wasseige	Xavier	M	43		banker	Tschoffen Wall
664	Watrisse	Emile	M	28		weaver	Bourdon Wall
665	Wilmotie	Camille	M	23		streetcar conductor (cashier)	Impasse Saint-Roch
666	Winand	Antoine-Ignace	M	36		dressmaker	Rue Saint-Pierre
667	Winand	Victor	M	30		cobbler	Rue Saint-Pierre
668	Zwollen	Edouard	M	38		marchand de charbons (factory worker)	Paper Mill
669	Zwollen	Georges	M	15		weaver	Fonds de Leffe
670	Zwollen	Joseph	M	42		weaver	Fonds de Leffe
+671	Bouchat	Adolphine	F	2 months 1/2			
+672	Demotie	Henri	M				
+673	Étienne	Joseph	M	55			
+674	Polita	Raymond	M	21			
+	unknown 1		M				Pont d'Amour
+	unknown 2		M				Tschoffen Wall
+	unknown 3		M				Neffe (linen marked H.A)

==== The witnesses ====
Map of massacre sites

Just a few days after the events that affected Dinant, local residents undertook the task of documenting their personal accounts to reconstruct the events as they unfolded. Among these accounts, three depositions from the Bishopric of Namur and the Abbey of Maredsous are noteworthy. The witnesses provide evidence that:

The whole family was gathered at my parents' house, which backed onto the rock behind the homes of Joseph Rondelet and the widow Camille Thomas, on rue Saint-Pierre. My father, who worked in Mianoye (Assesse), was absent. On Sunday, August 23, at around 4 p.m., when we saw Germans settling into the Café Rondelet, whose owners had fled the day before, and drinking themselves into a stupor, we fled into the mountains. My mother, who had stood in front of us with 4-year-old Marcel in her arms, raised the hand that was still free. Nevertheless, the soldiers fired on us: a first bullet broke Marcel's arm, a second hit my mother in the wrist and a third blew her brains out. Other bullets hit my sisters Adèle and Éloïse, who fall. While Léon, Aline and Paul fled to one side, I managed to hide in a rock, where I remained until Monday evening. Then the Germans discovered me and, along with others, took me to the Premonstratensians, where I found those of my family still alive. Little René, my sister Éloïse's son, had been taken in by Mme Barzin and Mme Coupienne by order of the Germans. Arthur Bietlot, who buried our dead, declares that little Marcel's corpse was literally in pieces. Constantin Demuyter was buried with ours, but I don't know how he got there. Eugène Mathieu's corpse was also found in our garden, but a little higher up.

— Albine Bovy, Rapport no 431

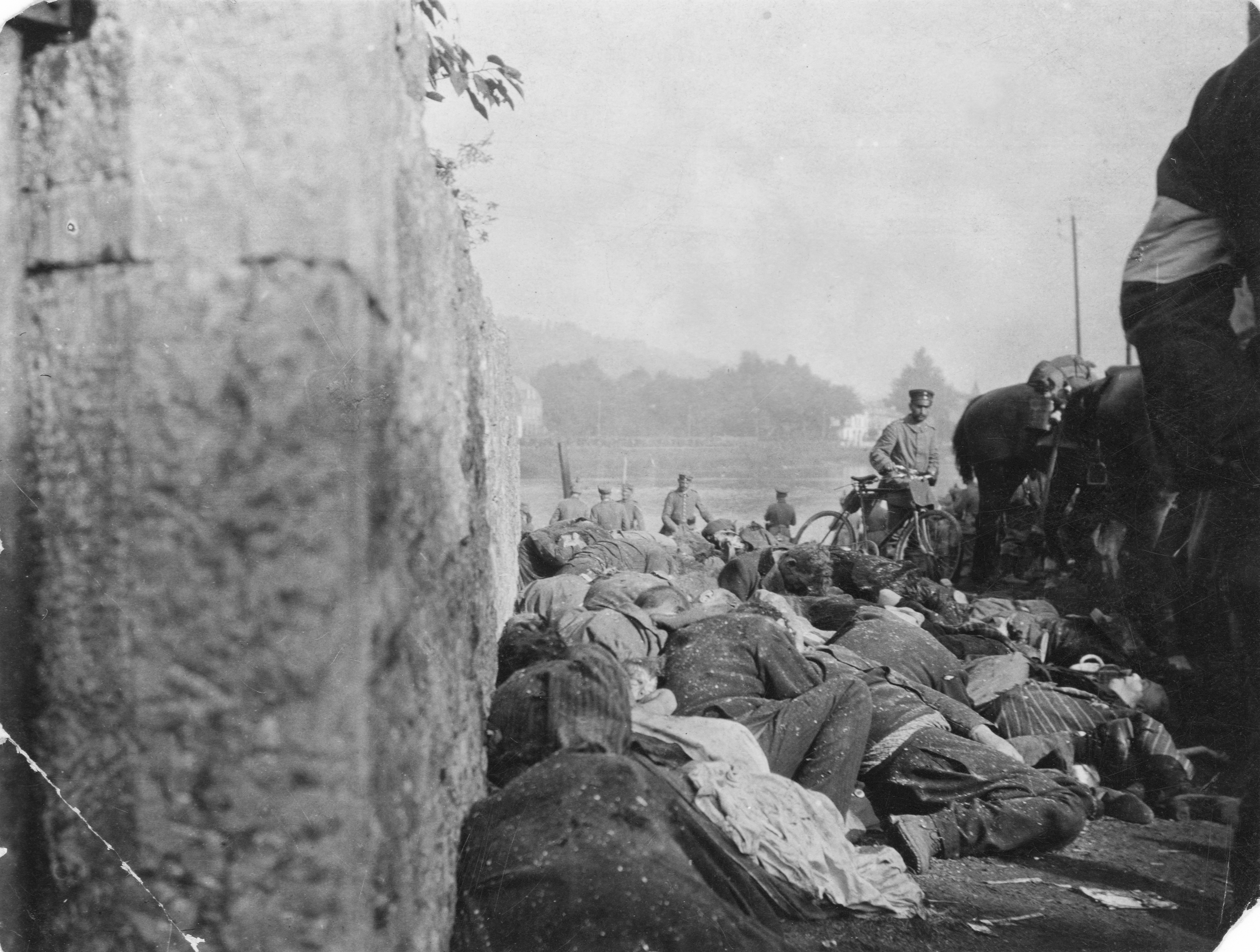
The 76 victims of the "Bourdon Wall"

Early in the morning of August 23, the cannon sounded and we thought we were witnessing a battle similar to that of the 15th . Taking advantage of a slight lull, at around 10 a.m., my father and I opened the front door to get a better idea of what was going on in the street. We quickly closed it, spotting German soldiers at the barracks, who had raised their rifles at the sight of us, and went underground. Some time later, we hear the sound of windows being broken and doors being kicked in. Soon we could clearly hear the blows of an axe shaking ours. My parents decided to open the door, and were already in the corridor, when the door gave way under the blows of these energetic men who burst into the house, shouting like demons, and unloading their weapons at point-blank range. My father, hit in the chest, staggered back a few steps, clung to his cutting table and fell: he was dead. My mother, hit in the shoulder, cries out in pain and takes refuge in the cellar, while my grandmother, trying to help her mortally wounded son, is herself hit by a bullet in the back of the neck that sends her sprawling to the ground. A fourth shot hit my grandfather, seated in an armchair, killing him. Seeing me, the bandits unload their weapons on me, but the bullets whistle past my ears without hitting me. The soldiers, convinced that they had spared no one, withdrew, and soon all around me was dead silence.

— Maurice Lion, Rapport no 426

No sooner had we arrived in front of the Bourdon wall than we were fired upon; I fell. Alexandre Bourdon was on top of me. Around 9 p.m., I tried to get up; they immediately fired in my direction, but as I was below Bourdon, it was he who was hit. I could then see what was going on around me. I heard a baby crying and asking for a drink - it was little Gilda Marchot, aged 2. A German immediately approached, put the barrel of his rifle in the child's mouth and fired! Disgusted, I turned to the other side and saw a soldier carrying something at the end of his bayonet; I recognized the body of my little niece, Mariette Fivet, who was three weeks old. After playing with this child's corpse, the soldier laid it on the ground and put his foot on its stomach to remove his bayonet... The next day, I buried the bodies of my brother, my sister-in-law and little Mariette, 22 days old. I found that the baby's cloths were all torn in the stomach and filled with blood.

— Camille Fivet, Rapport no 475

=== Immediate response to the massacre ===
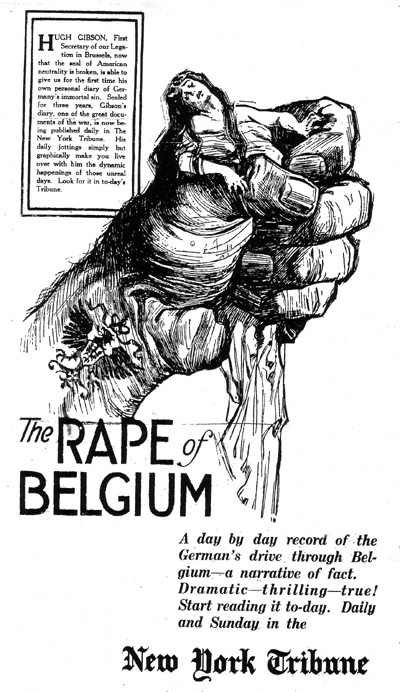
Illustration of the Rape of Belgium by the New York Tribune

Thomas-Louis Heylen, the Bishop of Namur, informed Pope Benedict XV of the situation, leading to widespread outrage among the global population. In response, a group of 93 German intellectuals issued the "Manifesto of the Ninety-Three", a document attempting to absolve their army. On May 10, 1915, Germany's Foreign Office released The German White Book aimed at demonstrating that "the German troops, unfortunate in their circumstances, were subjected to brutal and unprovoked attacks from a fanatic population" in Dinant.

In reply, the Cooreman government published its Grey Book of 1916, which asserted: "He is twice guilty who, after violating the rights of others, attempts to justify himself with audacity by attributing false faults to his victim." The Anglo-Saxon press condemned the events, referring to them as "The Rape of Belgium," a term that has since become associated with the atrocities committed against Belgian civilians in August and September 1914.

For his part, the Bishop of Namur responds to the Germans following the publication of their White Book:

We are only waiting for the moment when the impartial historian can come to Dinant, see for himself what happened there, and interview the survivors. There are enough of them left to reconstruct all the facts in their truth and sincerity. Then it will become clear that there has never been a time when the innocence of the victims has been more clearly demonstrated, and the guilt of the perpetrators more obvious. Events will resolve themselves in the unleashing, within an army, of a cruelty as useless as it is inexplicable. Then the universe, which has already judged with extreme and just rigor the massacre of nearly seven hundred civilians and the destruction of an ancient city, with its monuments, archives and industries, will appreciate with even greater severity this new procedure which, to clear itself of a deserved accusation, stops at nothing and transforms unjustly sacrificed victims into assassins.

== Post-war trials ==
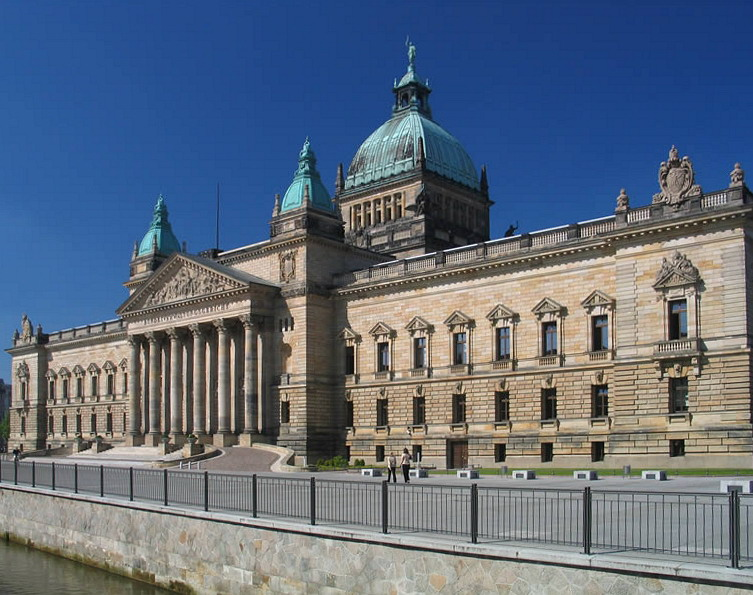
Building that housed Leipzig's Reichsgericht in 1921

At the Treaty of Versailles, Germany was compelled by the Allies to conduct a set of trials for purported German war criminals known as the Leipzig Trials, which occurred in 1921. In February 1920, the Allied extradition list had 853 names of chiefs of the former German regime accused of committing heinous acts against civilians, wounded or prisoners of war. Out of the 853, only 43 names were registered with the German Reichsgericht. France called for the trial of 11 individuals, Belgium for 15, Great Britain for 5, and Italy, Poland, Romania, and Yugoslavia for 12. However, these instructions did not pertain to the Dinant massacre.

The concept of trying a nation’s citizens for war crimes was unprecedented. Despite this, the Leipzig Trials were largely deemed unsatisfactory by the Allies, as German courts often absolved the defendants or found mitigating circumstances. The sentences issued were considered lenient or symbolic compared to the gravity of the crimes.

In connection with the atrocities committed by the 3rd German Army, France and Belgium indicted seven generals. On May 9, 1925, a court martial in Dinant sentenced German officers, found guilty in absentia of sacking the town. However, by the end of 1925, the Leipzig court rejected all these judgments and took no further action.

Among the seven generals was Colonel Johann Meister, who commanded the 101st Grenadier Regiment. He was acquitted due to insufficient evidence. This decision was influenced by the German investigations conducted in 1915 and 1920, which supported the arguments presented in the White Book regarding the francs-tireurs. Additionally, while the court acknowledged the occurrence of hostage executions, it found no evidence that they were carried out unlawfully.

== Remembrance ==
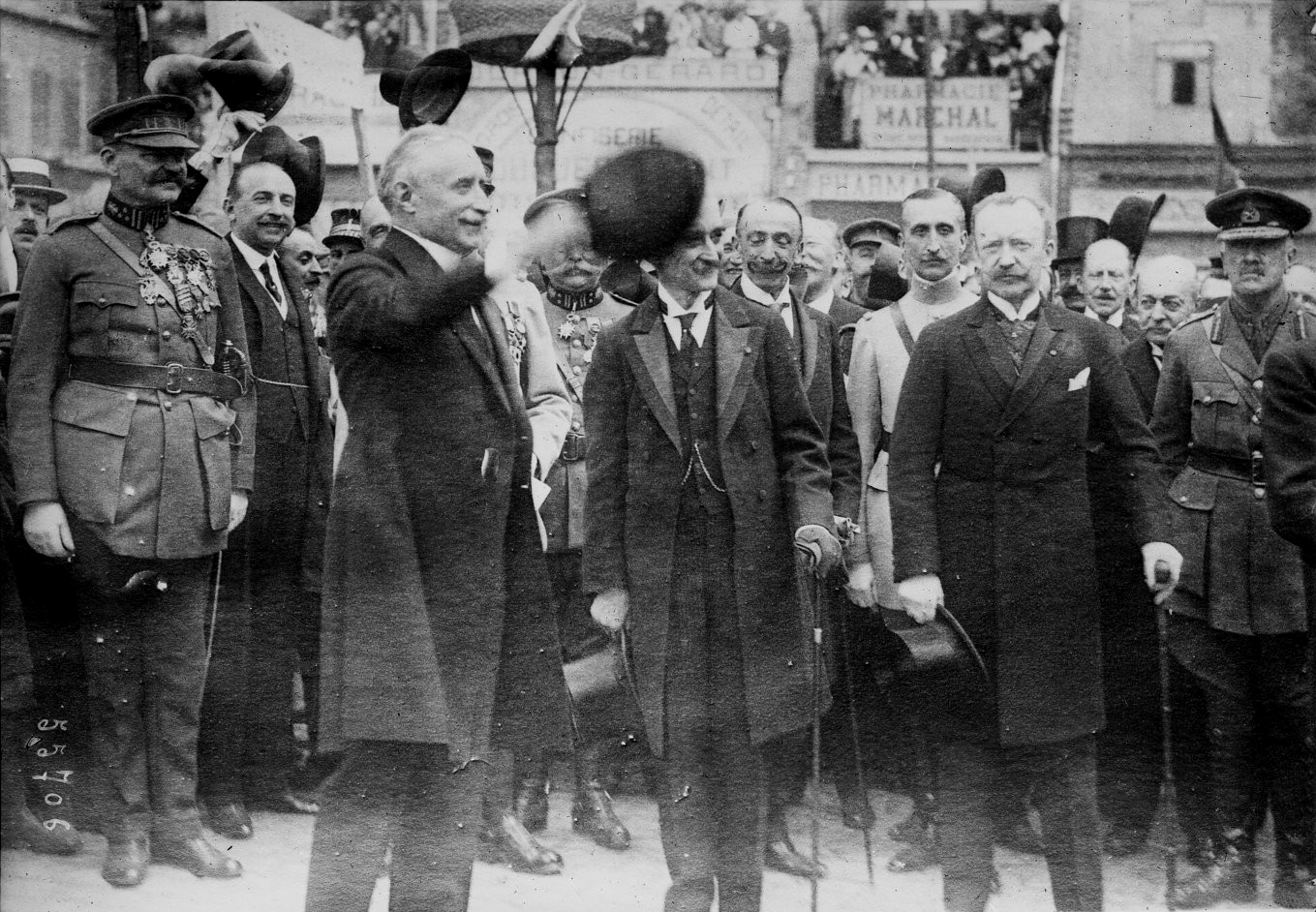
Paul Deschanel, President of the French Chamber of Deputies, at the August 23, 1919 commemorations in Dinant

=== Commemorations ===
On August 23, 1919, Paul Deschanel, the president of the French Chamber of Deputies, honored the victims of Dinant. Jean Schmitz and Norbert Nieuwland utilize this speech to demonstrate Dinant's distinctiveness among other Belgian and French towns that were martyred:

"Dinant is one of the stations on the bloody road by which humanity has risen, in pain, to justice". These were the words of Paul Deschanel, then President of the French Chamber, as he stood over the ruins of the town and the graves of its victims on August 23, 1919, the anniversary of the Sack of Dinant. And he was right. Of all the martyred towns on the Western Front - and God knows there were many in both France and Belgium - no one would deny Dinant first place. Dinant has paid a high enough price for this dismal honor, moreover, for it not to be haggled over; For it is not only a past of glory and prosperity that it has seen wiped out in the space of a few hours, it is not only historical memories and works of art that it has seen destroyed by the incendiary torch - other towns have suffered materially more than the Mosan city, but they are already coming back to life - no, what places the town of Dinant at the top of the long list of martyred cities is its obituary. It mourns nearly seven hundred of its children who are no longer with us and who, innocent victims, were cowardly murdered by the enemy without any prior judgment having been passed, without any proof of guilt having been formulated against them.

=== Memorials and monuments ===
On August 20, 1922, a commemorative monument was unveiled at "La Papeterie" (Ravet sawmill) to honor 68 individuals who were executed at this location. The monument, which remains visible today, stands as a testament to the tragedy that occurred there, despite having been destroyed in 1940.

Additionally, two bronze plaques were inaugurated by the Compagnie des Bronzes de Bruxelles on that same day at the former fabric factory site to honor its director, Remy Himmer, and his 147 employees. Lost for some time, the objects were discovered in a public dump in Anseremme in 1956 and kept in the Fonds de Leffe until 2005, when they were finally returned to their original place.

On August 23, 1923, a neo-classical monument was erected in Neffe which, unfortunately, was damaged by the Germans in 1940. The monument commemorates the 81 victims, including 23 individuals killed at the aqueduct and the Neffe citizens executed at the "Bourdon Wall."

On August 23, 1927, the "Altar of the Fatherland" was unveiled in the courtyard of the town hall in the presence of the Crown Prince of Belgium. This monument was created by Brussels sculptor Frans Huygelen, and it represents an allegory of the victorious Fatherland in several bronze groups. The occasion was also marked with the inauguration of commemorative steles in different parts of the city, including the "Tschoffen Wall". This impressive bronze relief is 1.4 meters tall and 3.5 meters long and was crafted by the same artist. The blue stone base bears the inscription: "Pieux hommage du souvenir dinantais aux 674 victimes innocentes de la furie teutonne dont 116 trouvèrent la mort ici, le 23 août 1914" (A sincere tribute of Dinant memory to the innocent victims of German savagery, 116 of whom died here on August 23, 1914). In 1927, a commemorative monument was also erected at the "Mur Bourdon" site. The sculpture, depicting a firing squad holding women and children at gunpoint, has since been lost. The Sacré-Coeur, inaugurated on October 5, 1930, pays homage to the 83 individuals, seven of whom were children aged between three weeks and two years, who perished at the site.

Erected in Leffe on Place de l'Abbaye at "À la cliche de bois", this structure replaced an earlier memorial built around 1920. Notably, the former Servais house bears a commemorative plaque sculpted by Frans Huygelen portraying a bust of Christ on the cross as a tribute to the 243 Leffe victims.

On August 23, 1936, a monument honoring the 23,700 Belgian civilian victims of August and September 1914, which included the 674 victims of the sack of Dinant, was unveiled at the Place d'Armes (Furore Teutonico). The monument was created by sculptor Pierre de Soete and features a central hand with two fingers reaching upwards as a sign of promise. The central stele repeats the Dinant oath, commemorating the victims.

Before God and before Men, on our honor and conscience, without hatred and without anger, penetrated by the importance of the oath we are about to take, we all swear that we did not, in August 1914, know, see or know of anything that could have constituted an act of illegitimate violence against the troops of the invader.

The Germans destroyed it in May 1940 during World War II.

On August 23, 2014, a new memorial with a complete list of the victims was inaugurated on the banks of the Meuse to mark the centenary of the massacre in the presence of the King and the authorities.

Some Dinant memorials

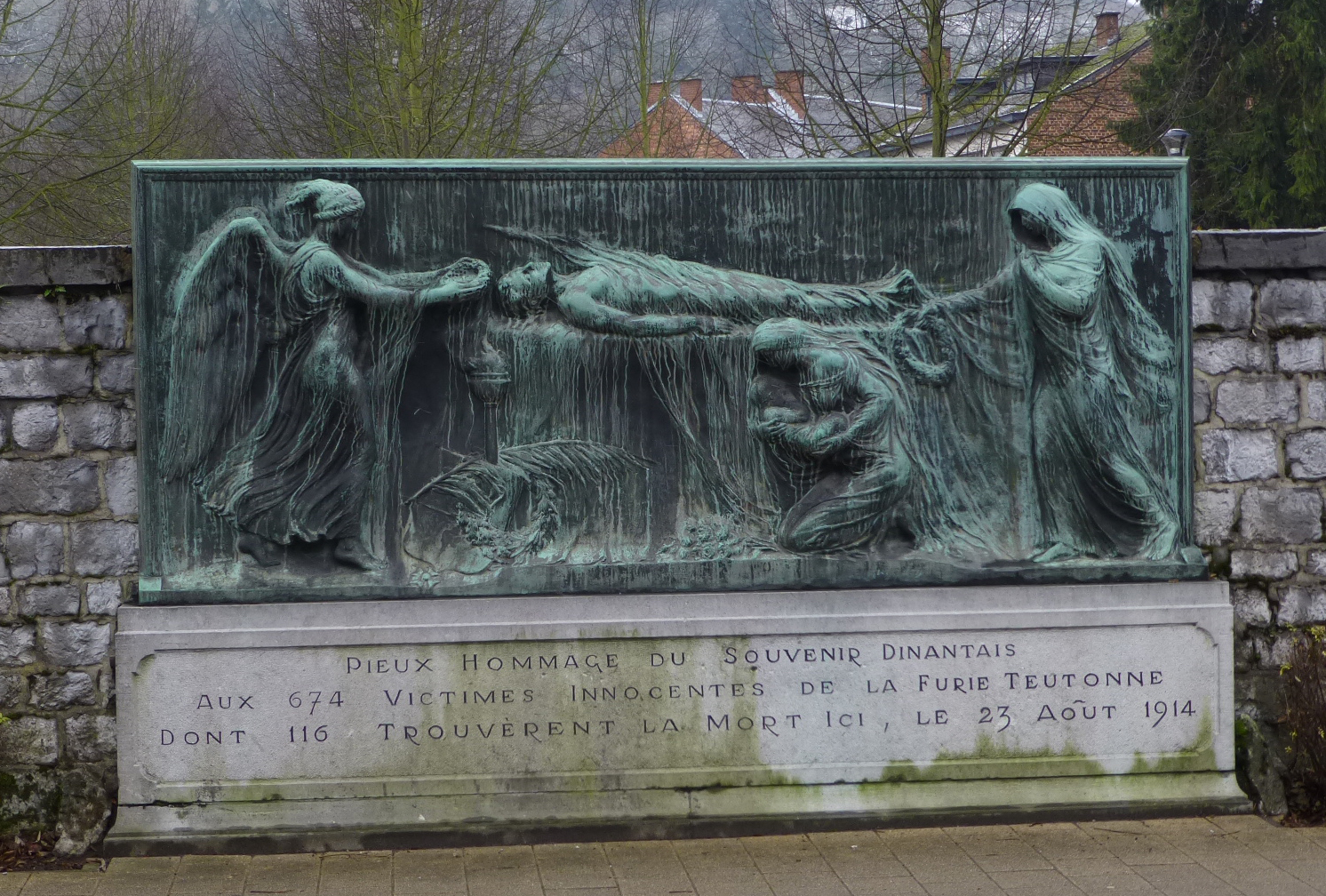
Memorial to the 674 victims (Tschoffen wall)

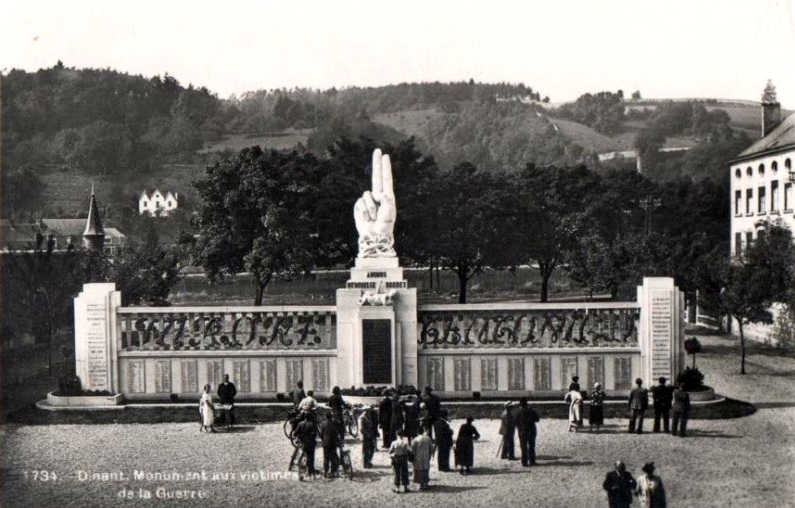
The national monument to the civilian victims of 1914-1918, destroyed in 1940

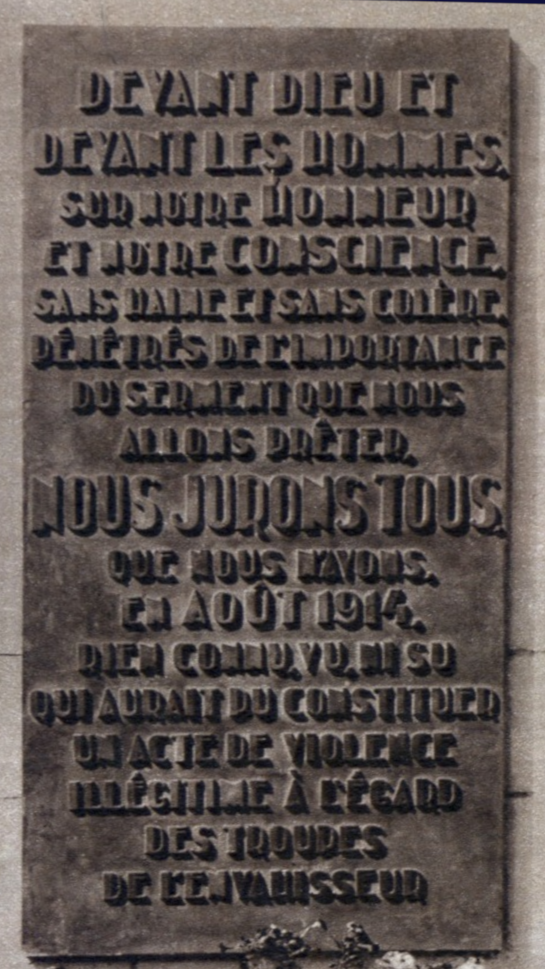
The Dinant oath

=== Belated apology from Germany ===
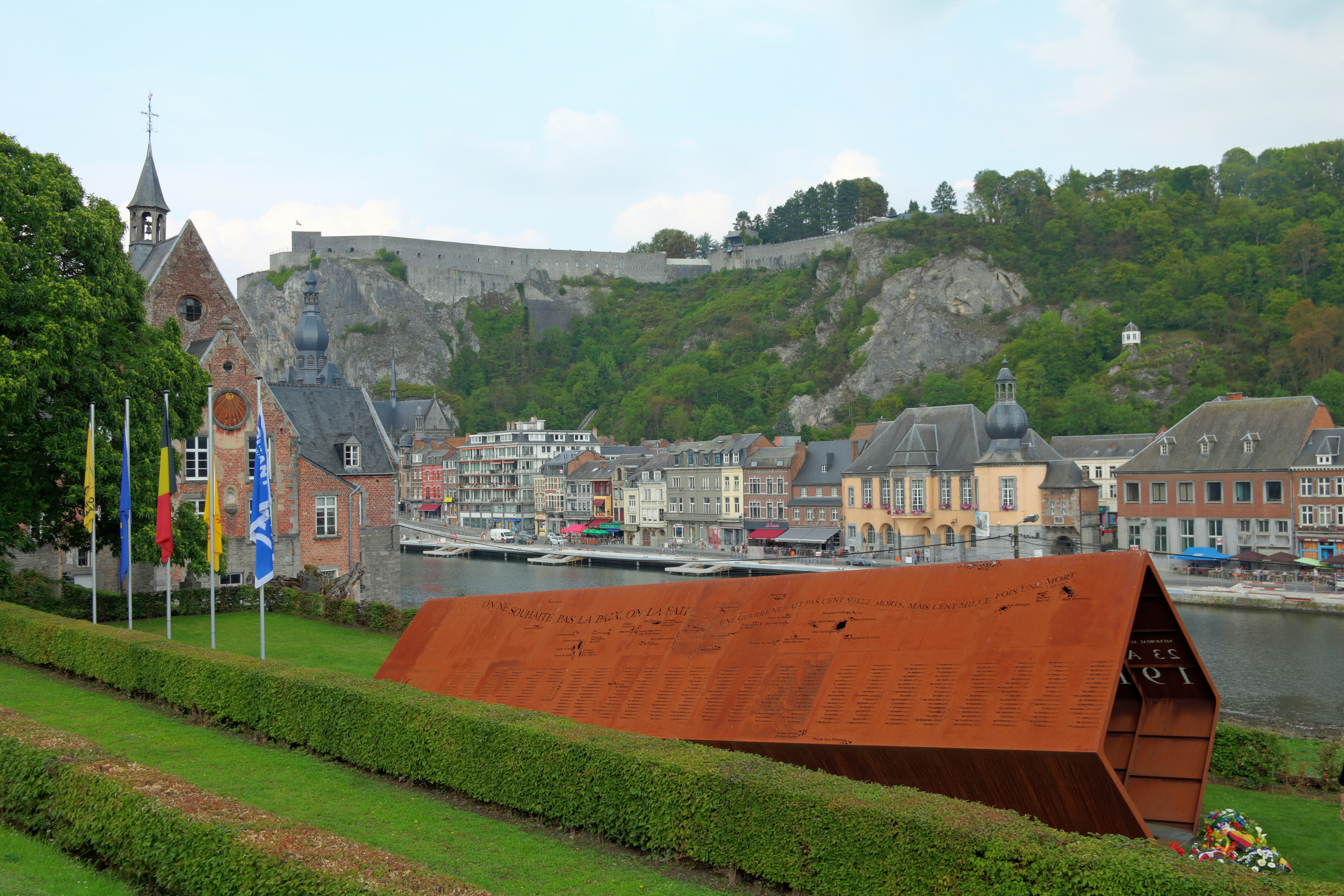
The centenary memorial (on the left bank of the Meuse)

On May 6, 2001, the German government, led by Secretary of State for Defense Walter Kolbow, issued an official apology 87 years after the events in question for the atrocities committed against the Dinant population in 1914.

[...] And that's why I'm here today. I would like to ask you all to forgive the injustices that Germans once committed in this country. I ask this because I believe that such a request is more necessary than ever, precisely at a time when the process of European unification is intensifying, a Europe in which our two countries are jointly pursuing a policy aimed at preventing the recurrence of such crimes and suffering.

The local authorities stated that granting forgiveness in the name of the deceased was not within their purview, but they appreciated the effort to reconcile and move forward, particularly for the benefit of younger generations. Following this, a symbolic act was carried out by young Belgians and Germans who raised the German flag on the Dinant bridge, which had previously been the only flag missing among the display of other European flags.

== Historiography ==
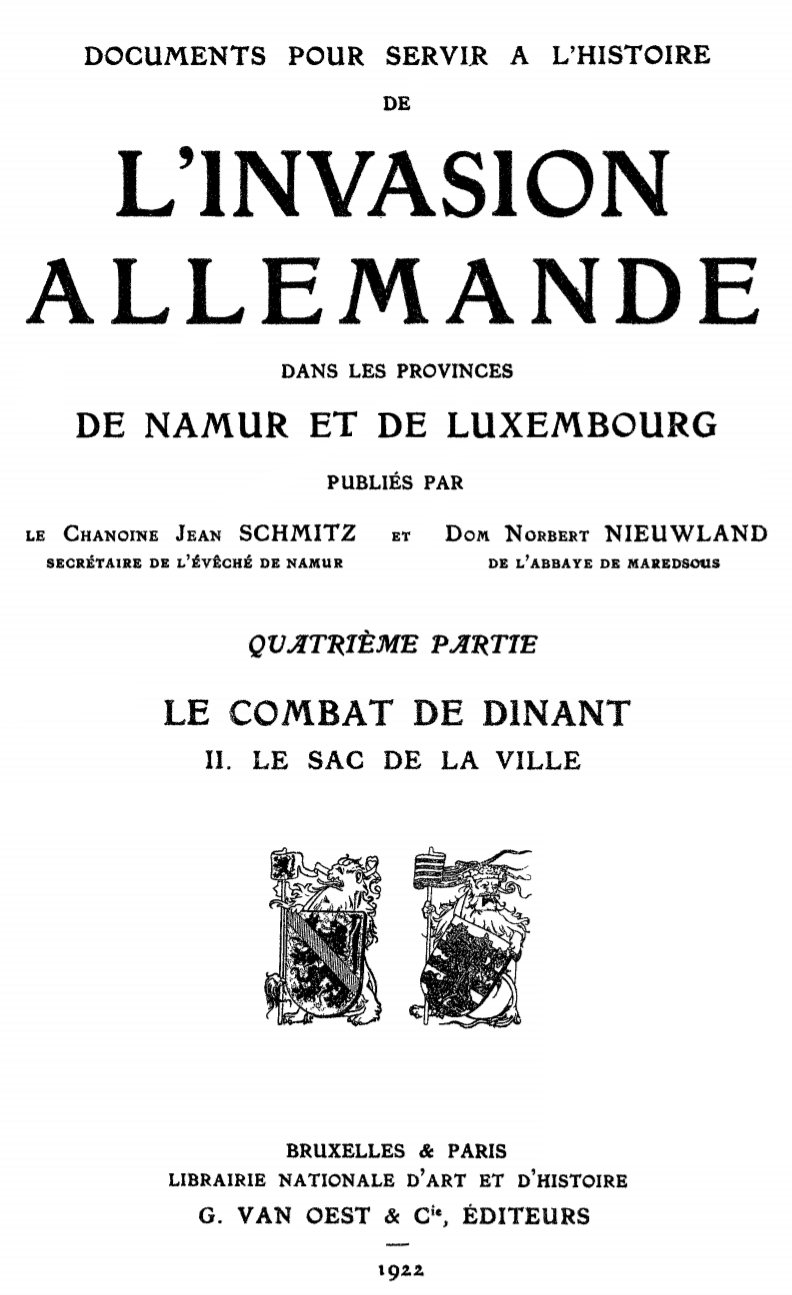
Published by Canon Jean Schmitz and Dom Norbert Nieuwland in 1922

=== The immediate post-massacre research ===
Written accounts of the Dinant massacres were collected during the winter of 1914, with the initial goal of documenting testimonies and compiling an accurate list of victims. Joseph Chot, who had met Philippe Pétain in August 1914, sought eyewitness accounts throughout the Namur region. Dom Norbert Nieuwland of Maredsous Abbey published the first obituary, which listed 606 names. This text was republished multiple times, including by foreign press, leading to its prohibition by the German military command.

The press, predominantly British but also including that of neutral nations, disseminated firsthand accounts from civilians and informative pamphlets that condemned the actions of the German Heer. The German army was accused of violating the agreements established by Germany under the Hague Convention of 1907. Occasionally, the desire for emphasis led some journalists to extend their assertions, as noted by Edouard Gérard:

People of letters more concerned, it seems, with 'monetizing our disaster' - the expression is not mine - than with contributing to "bringing the truth to light", have already published high fantasy accounts. This is an insult to the memory of our martyrs.

Belgium is frequently perceived as a victim by both British and American commentators, who often refer to the tragic events as the "rape of Belgium." It is notable that some Americans may be unaware of the United States' humanitarian involvement during this period.

In response to the criticism, 93 German intellectuals issued a "manifesto to civilized nations" in an attempt to exonerate their army from any wrongdoing.

The German White Book, published in February 1915, claimed that imperial troops encountered francs-tireurs who were allegedly organized, armed, and trained by the Belgian government. According to the White Book, these francs-tireurs, comprising both men and women, and even children, conducted numerous covert attacks on German troops, leading to substantial losses. The document asserted that such attacks necessitated a violent response. In reaction to the allegations presented in the German White Book, Mgr. Thomas-Louis Heylen, the Bishop of Namur, released a Protestation contre les accusations du Livre Blanc allemand in October 1915. Further opposition to the White Book came from Belgium, which published its own Grey Book in May 1916.

Cardinal Mercier had earlier called for the collection of accurate and objective information regarding the atrocities committed by the Germans, independent of the State's efforts in producing the Grey Book.

Following this call, Mgr. Thomas-Louis Heylen appointed his secretary, Canon Jean Schmitz, to gather testimonies and documents to provide a detailed account of the suffering endured by Belgium due to what he termed the Germans' "monument of hypocrisy and lies." Leveraging his position within the bishopric, Canon Schmitz enlisted the support of all 719 parishes in the diocese. He quickly recognized the complexity of producing a well-organized and impartial report and collaborated with the vicar-general to collect evidence, documentation, and photographic records of the perpetrators' actions. The initial report was forwarded to Military Governor Moritz von Bissing, as well as representatives of neutral countries and Pope Benedict XV, on October 31, 1915.

Cardinal Mercier initially appointed Dom Norbert Nieuwland from Maredsous Abbey to undertake a task related to documenting the atrocities, unaware that a similar task had already been assigned to Canon Jean Schmitz. In November 1918, they collaborated, merging their extensive documentation of over 2,000 testimonies collected throughout the four-year war to ensure the objectivity of their sources.

This collaboration resulted in the publication of seven volumes of "Documents pour servir à l'histoire de l'invasion allemande dans les provinces de Namur et de Luxembourg" between 1919 and 1924. Volume IV, which is divided into two parts, specifically addresses the Battle of Dinant. The first part, detailing the conquest of the Meuse, was released in June 1921, while the second part, focusing on the sacking of the town, was published in April 1922.

The archives of Jean Schmitz are held at the bishopric of Namur, while Dom Norbert Nieuwland's archives are stored at Maredsous Abbey. The documentation has been accessible to researchers from an early stage. Jean Schmitz's archives consist of 41 boxes that have been classified and indexed by an archivist. (Note: by Anne Cherton.) In contrast, Dom Norbert Nieuwland’s archives are contained in a single box related to the 1914-1918 period. These documents were hastily buried in a metal box during World War II and were found to be largely degraded by the war's end. In 1938, a portion of Jean Schmitz’s documents was transferred to the State Archives in Namur and cataloged in 1991. (Note: by Michel Majoros.) This collection encompasses 4.54 linear meters of records, mainly organized into thematic files. Unfortunately, the method employed by Jean Schmitz—fragmenting and thematically organizing the original documents—has made reconstructing the initial parish reports a challenging task.

Schmitz and Nieuwland's work, already praised in the 1920s, continues to be highly esteemed by contemporary historians studying the subject. According to John Horne and Alan Kramer, the documentation remains exceptional.

=== Interwar period ===
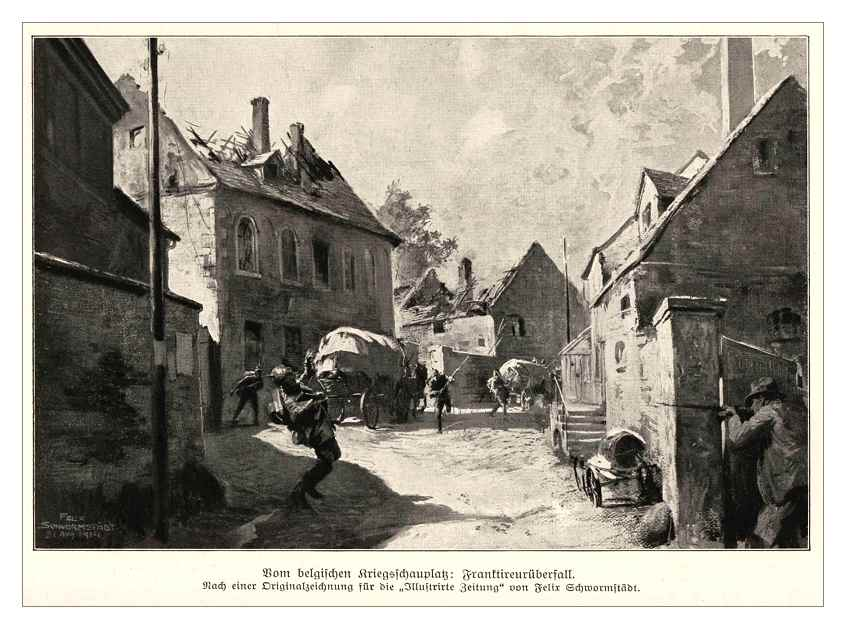
Propaganda drawing by painter Felix Schormstädt for the Illustrirte Zeitung in September 1914

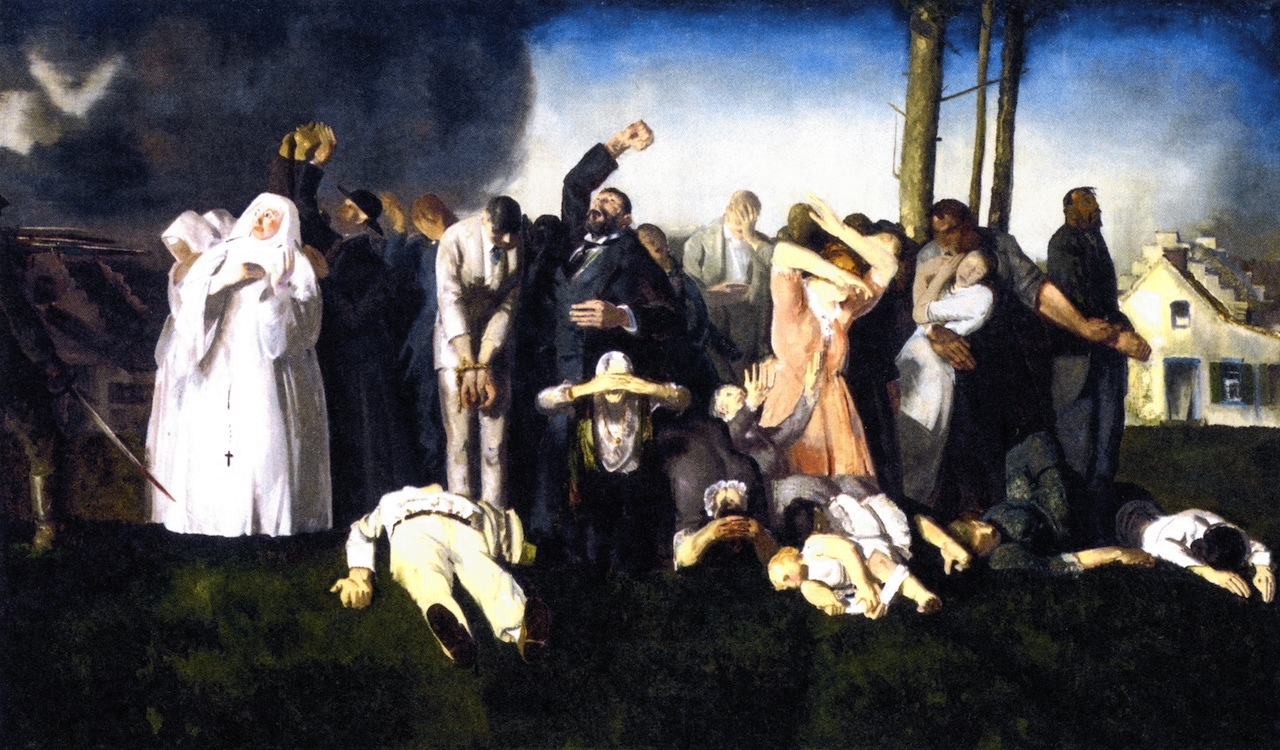
An emphatic vision of the massacre by American artist George Bellows in 1918

In the 1920s, Dinant saw the unveiling of several memorials dedicated to the victims of the August 1914 atrocities. The German government, offended by the terms "German barbarism" and "Teutonic fury" used in these memorials, criticized the Belgian government for perpetuating what they considered the "legend of atrocities". This controversy was reignited in 1927 when Professor Christian Meurer, commissioned by the Reichstag to investigate the events of August 1914, submitted his conclusions. The Weimar Republic endorsed Meurer's findings, which reaffirmed the presence of "franktireurkriegers" and supported the thesis of the White Book. In response, Norbert Nieuwland and Maurice Tschoffen published with their book "Le Conte de fée des francs-tireurs de Dinant: Réponse au rapport du professor Meurer de l'Université de Würzburg." Meurer criticized Tschoffen for insulting Germany in his response to Tschoffen's first reports in the Belgian government's XXth report.

Third criticism of my reports. "They contain nothing but insults against the Germans", you write. This is not true, Professor, and you know it. I defy you to cite an insulting expression you've read in them; there isn't one! I reported the facts; I didn't qualify them. I didn't need to; they were self-explanatory. Furthermore, I agree with you on the principle that insults are not arguments, and I think that expressions such as 'dirty inventions', 'bestial cruelties', 'atrocities that could not be more repulsive' are more the stuff of pamphlets than of history. I gather them from your work. To conclude this letter, I search in vain for the polite formula appropriate to the nature of our relationship. Please allow me, Professor, not to use any.

— Maurice Tschoffen, King's Public Prosecutor in Dinant

During the interwar period, revisionist literature began to emerge, including in English-speaking countries, influenced by the dynamics of pacification.

In May 1940, during World War II, the occupying forces used the pretext of affront to justify the dynamiting of the memorial dedicated to the 674 victims of August 1914. The memorial, titled "Furore Teutonico," had been erected in 1936 on the Place d'Armes. In the 1950s, there was an ongoing dispute over whether to include the events of August 1914 in history textbooks. During the 1960s, historians from Germany, Belgium, and France collaborated on the matter. Specifically, Belgians Fernand Mayence, Jean de Sturler, and Léon van der Essen, worked alongside Germans Franz Petri, Hans Rothfels, and Werner Conze.

=== Events and recent historical research ===
In 1994, John Horne and Allan Kramer published an article analyzing the campaign diaries of German soldiers who were in Belgium during August 1914. This publication effectively debunked the exaggerations and inventions about German atrocities committed in Belgium during World War I. Since 1995, historians such as Michel Coleau, Aurore François, Michel Kellner, Vincent Scarniet, Axel Tixhon, and Frédéric Vesentini have conducted research on this episode. Utilizing primary sources, including German war diaries and eyewitness accounts, these historians have established and analyzed the facts surrounding the events.

In 2001, John Horne and Allan Kramer published German Atrocities, which was subsequently translated into French in 2005 under the title 1914. Les Atrocités allemandes, subtitled La Vérité sur les crimes de guerre en France et en Belgique. The sacking of Dinant is now recognized as a reality.

However, in August 2017, art historian Ulrich Keller reignited the controversy in his book Schuldfragen: Belgischer Untergrundkrieg und deutsche Vergeltung im August 1914 (Questions de culpabilité: guerre clandestine belge et représailles allemandes en août 1914). Keller argues that civilian gunfire towards the German army provoked a severe German response against the population. His analysis, based on archival documents from Berlin, reveals the discovery of Belgian and French soldiers' uniforms in Dinant without accompanying weapons. Keller concludes that some soldiers may have disguised themselves as civilians to attack German soldiers, citing injuries sustained by soldiers that seemed inconsistent with conventional weaponry but rather suggestive of shotguns.

Horne and Kramer acknowledge that while isolated instances of civilians firing on enemy forces might have occurred, as permitted by the Second Hague Conference of 1907, such instances were rare. Military historian Fernand Gérard has called on Angela Merkel to request a formal denial from her government. On November 27, 2017, the municipal council of Dinant officially denounced Keller's allegations and urged the federal government to adopt the same position. The German newspaper Die Welt now concurs with Axel Tixhon's findings. Although the Belgian militia (the Garde Civique) may have fired on the Germans, (Note: and no later than August 15th.) there was no occurrence of Franktireurkrieg ("francs-tireurs war") in Dinant. The latter appears to have been a fabrication by German soldiers. Finally, given that Keller's conclusions rely heavily on his interpretations, their validity remains questionable. Axel Tixhon, a historian specializing in the events of August 1914, argues that Keller's work is driven by objectives that diverge from those of rigorous scientific research.

== Linked personalities ==
=== Philippe Pétain and Charles de Gaulle ===
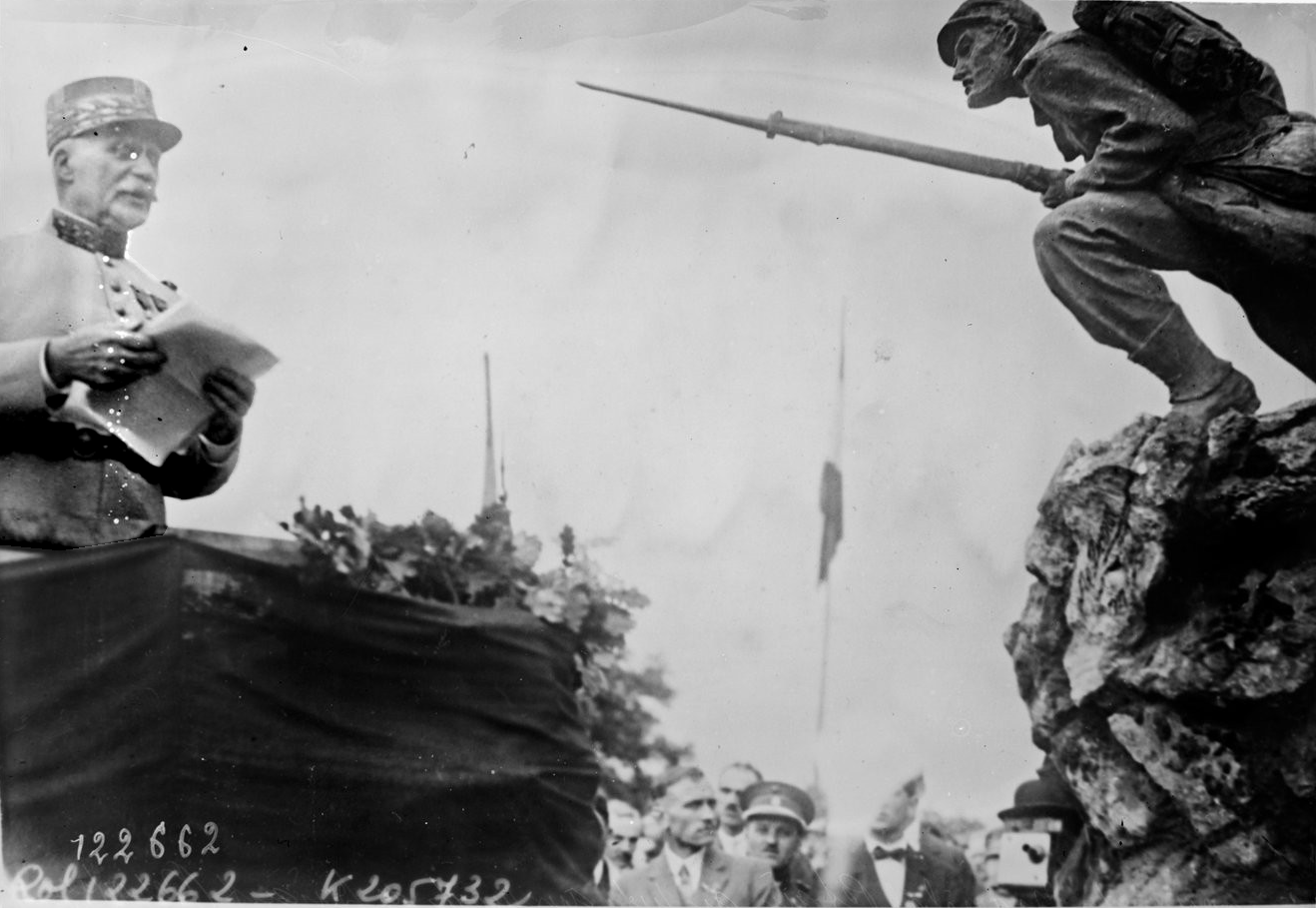
Philippe Pétain inaugurates the L'Assaut monument by sculptor Alexandre Daoust at the citadel's French cemetery on the 11th.

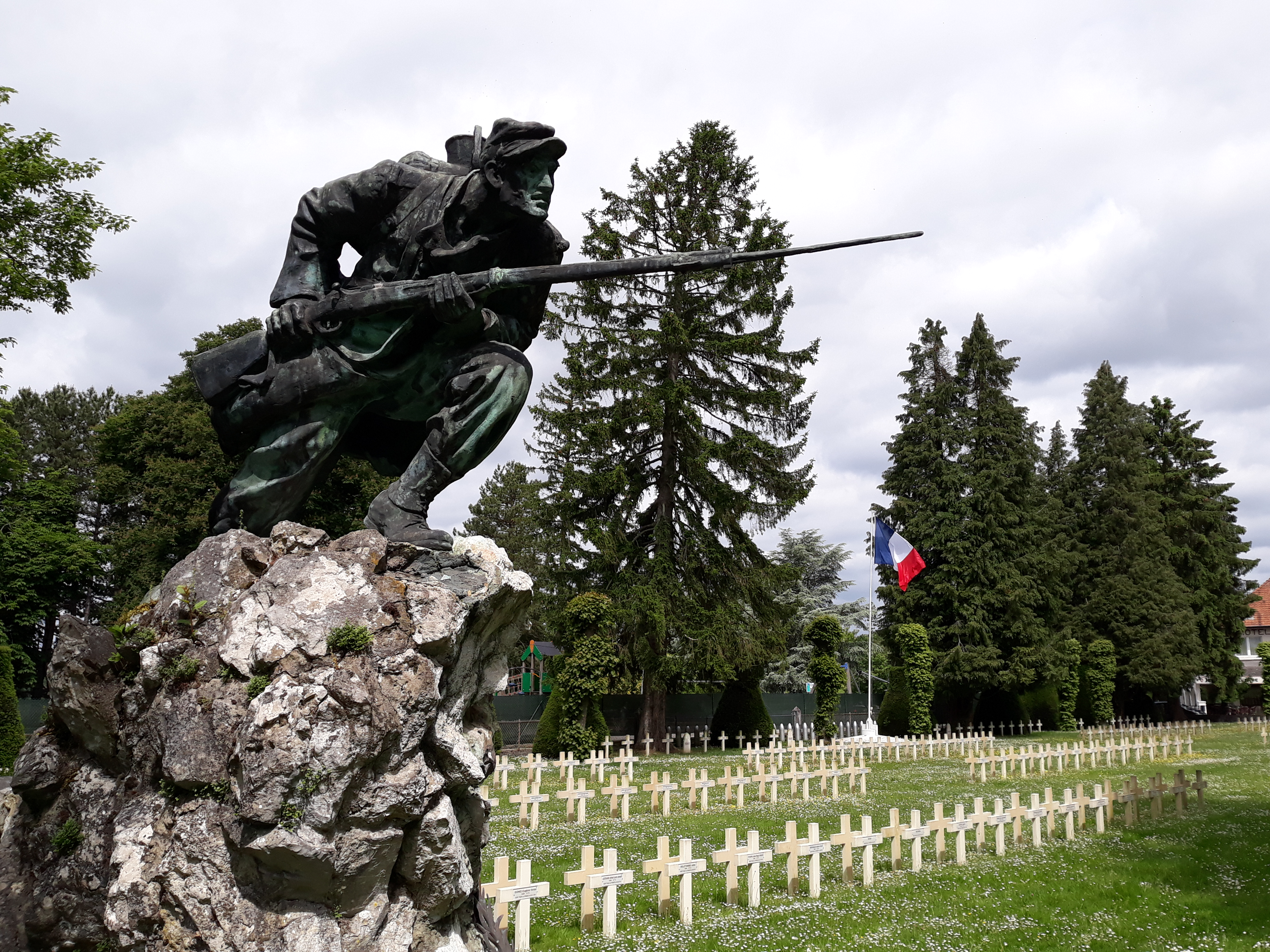
L'Assaut monument in May 2019

Two significant figures who played crucial roles in World War II were present in Dinant. Firstly, Philippe Pétain, at the age of 58, served as a colonel under Charles Lanrezac, commander-in-chief of the 5th French Army during the war. Colonel Pétain led the 4th Brigade of the 1st Army Corps and arrived in Dinant on August 13. During his time there he stayed with Joseph Chot and his spouse.

The other influential figure was Charles de Gaulle, who, at 23 years old, served as a young lieutenant. He experienced his first significant combat on August 15, 1914. He led the first section of the 11th company of the Arras 33rd infantry regiment, under the command of General Duplessis. After a forced march, he reached Dinant on the night of August 14–15. Observing that the Germans had not yet occupied the town, his unit took position on a street in Dinant's faubourg Saint-Médard. In his war diaries published in 2014, he provides a detailed account of the events of August 15, including the circumstances leading to his injury as his unit crossed the Dinant bridge (now named after him) to support the troops engaged in the battle for the citadel.

I've barely crossed the twenty meters or so that separate us from the entrance to the bridge when I receive a whiplash-like blow to the knee that makes me miss my footing. The first four with me are also mowed down in the blink of an eye. I fall, and Sergeant Debout falls on top of me, killed stiff! Then, for half a minute, I'm surrounded by a hail of bullets. I can hear them cracking on the cobblestones and parapets, in front, behind and beside me! I also hear them thud into the corpses and wounded strewn across the ground. I think to myself: "My man, you're there!" Then, on reflection: "The only chance you've got of getting out of this is to drag yourself across the road to a house that's luckily open next door."

He crawled on his stomach while clutching his sabre, which was secured to his wrist by a lanyard, and eventually reached Madame Meurice’s residence. The house was crowded with civilians and soldiers, including a French Major who had lost control after a head injury. De Gaulle was later transported to Charleroi via Anthée and finally to the Hôpital Saint-Joseph in Paris, where he underwent surgery.

On September 11, 1927, Philippe Pétain, who was then serving as the vice-president of the Conseil supérieur de la guerre, visited Dinant with his aide-de-camp, Captain de Gaulle. Together, they inaugurated the L'Assaut monument, sculpted by Alexandre Daoust, located in the French cemetery of the Dinant citadel.

On August 15, 2014, a statue of Lieutenant de Gaulle was erected near the entrance to the bridge on the left bank. A commemorative plaque marks the exact spot where he was wounded, commemorating an episode that had a profound impact on his life. The plaque raises the question of why he survived while many others did not.

=== Prince Maximilian of Saxony ===
During the events of the Belgian invasion in World War I, Maximilian von Sachsen, the brother of King Frederick-Augustus III of Saxony, served as chaplain to the German 23rd Division during the invasion of Belgium. He witnessed the atrocities committed by his army and later confirmed these observations. Maximilian von Sachsen remarked:

If I could have foreseen this march through Belgium and all the things that went with it, I would have refused to follow the army as a military chaplain.

In his memoir, German chaplain Hermann Hoffmann recounts a September 1914 encounter with Prince Max, who was another volunteer chaplain. With tears in his eyes, Prince Max expressed that if a just god existed, Germany would lose the war because of the atrocities committed in Belgium.

Some historians of Dinant have suggested that Maximilian von Sachsen was the officer who intervened after the Tschoffen Wall shoot-out to prevent a potential mass execution at Dinant prison. However, there is no concrete evidence to support this claim. However, it is known that he intervened in Sorinnes, a few kilometers away, to halt the execution of civilians.

== See also ==
- Couillet Treaty
- German atrocities of 1914
- German occupation of Belgium during World War I
- Massacre of Tamines
- Rape of Belgium
- War crimes in World War I
