= For All We Have And Are =

1914 poem by Rudyard Kipling

- by Rudyard Kipling
- Language: English
- Subject(s): World War I
- Publisher: The Times, London; The New York Times; and other papers
- Publication date: 2 September 1914

Full text
- For all we have and are at Wikisource

"For All We Have And Are" is a 1914 poem by Rudyard Kipling in response to German war crimes during the First World War.

The poem was published in The Times of London and The New York Times on 2 September 1914, after the German invasion of Belgium the month before. Atrocities against Belgian civilians were attracted international notoriety and anger, particularly the Sack of Louvain.

Kipling in particular was very affected by the war, and his son had disappeared in 1915 during the Battle of Loos. Kipling was a war hawk and a staunch supporter of the Allies, whom he viewed as standing in the way of the German forces. According to scholar Irene de Angelis "Kipling equated Germany’s policy of Schreklichkeit in Belgium with the collapse of civilization." His poem was intended to serve as a call to arms against Germany.

The poem popularized the usage of the term "Hun" to describe the Germans. His use of the word was a remark on a patriotic speech by Wilhelm II that compared the German tradition to that of the Huns. 1914-1918-online described the word as an example of British propaganda during World War I, and has regularly been given as an example of anti-German sentiment. Some critics, such as Kingsley Amis, have defended Kipling, arguing that "“the Hun” is a metaphor for “the barbarian, the enemy of decent values”, and “the gate” is not that of England and the Empire, but that of civilisation."

"What stands if Freedom fall? / Who dies if England live?" was also popularized. The Indian Ministry of Defence quoted the words in a 2022 tweet in honour of the Indian army.
