= Schrecklichkeit =

German term

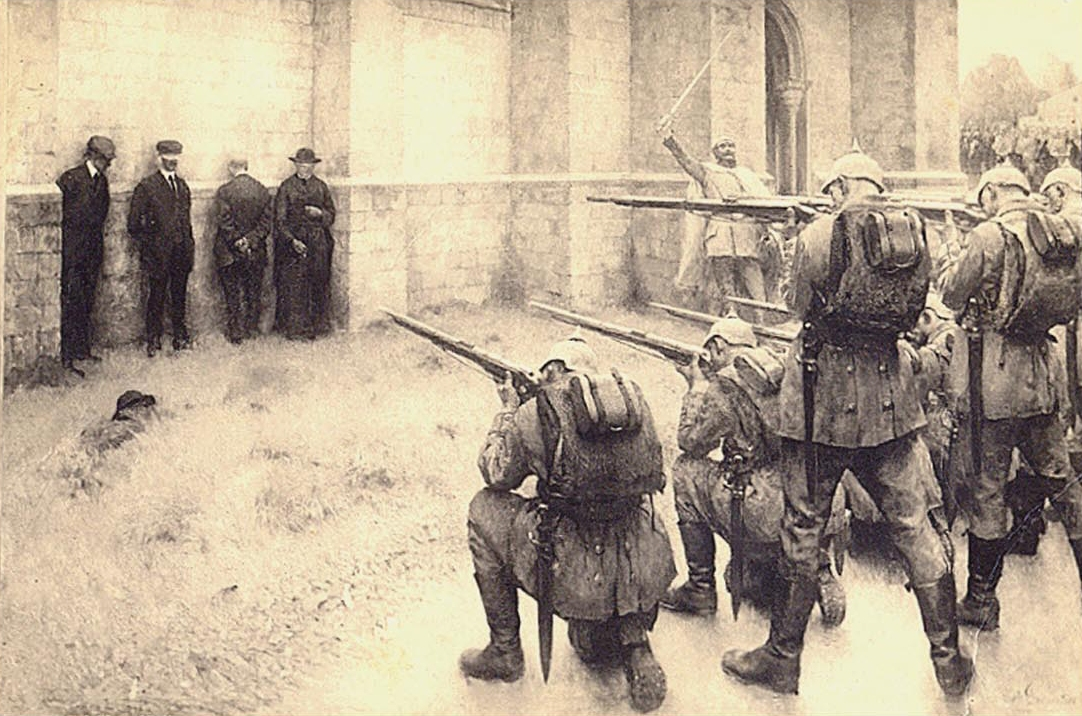
"The Execution of the Notables of Blégny", by the painter Evariste Carpentier depicting an event in the first days of the German invasion of Belgium

Schrecklichkeit (German; lit. 'terror' or 'frightfulness') describes the military policy of the Imperial German Army towards civilians in World War I. It was the basis of German actions during the invasion of Belgium in 1914. Similar policies were followed later in France, the Russian-held area of Poland, and in Russia.

== Wartime context ==
When Germany invaded Belgium in 1914, the German high command expected to sweep through the country with negligible opposition. The German army was many times larger and stronger than the Belgian army, and the Germans therefore thought that any resistance by Belgium would be futile. German leaders had even suggested to the Belgian government that in the event of war, the Belgians should just line up along the roads and watch the Germans march through. Belgium's refusal to accept these German presumptions and its resistance to the German advance came as a surprise, and disrupted the German timetable for advancing into France.

This frustration was communicated to the German troops in Belgium. Anything which delayed the German advance was to be crushed mercilessly. The Belgians were viewed as irrational and even treacherous for their opposition.

This led to exaggerated suspicions among German commanders of Belgian civilian resistance. It is possible that some Belgian civilians engaged in resistance, though none is documented. It is certain that on several occasions, German commanders declared that such acts had occurred when they had not.

The Germans responded to these perceived acts of resistance with harsh measures. In several villages and towns, hundreds of civilians were executed. Many buildings were put to the torch. Priests thought guilty of encouraging the resistance were killed. Violence by German soldiers against Belgians, such as rape, was ignored or not seriously punished. The Belgian city of Leuven was sacked and largely destroyed. One German officer later wrote about the town, "We shall wipe it out... Not one stone will stand upon another. We will teach them to respect Germany. For generations people will come here and see what we have done."

These actions, taken in a period of near-panic as the German forces desperately tried to carry out their flanking march before Allied forces could respond, proved to be a propaganda disaster for Germany. The reports of them caused a wave of indignation which aided the Allied cause.

== Analysis ==
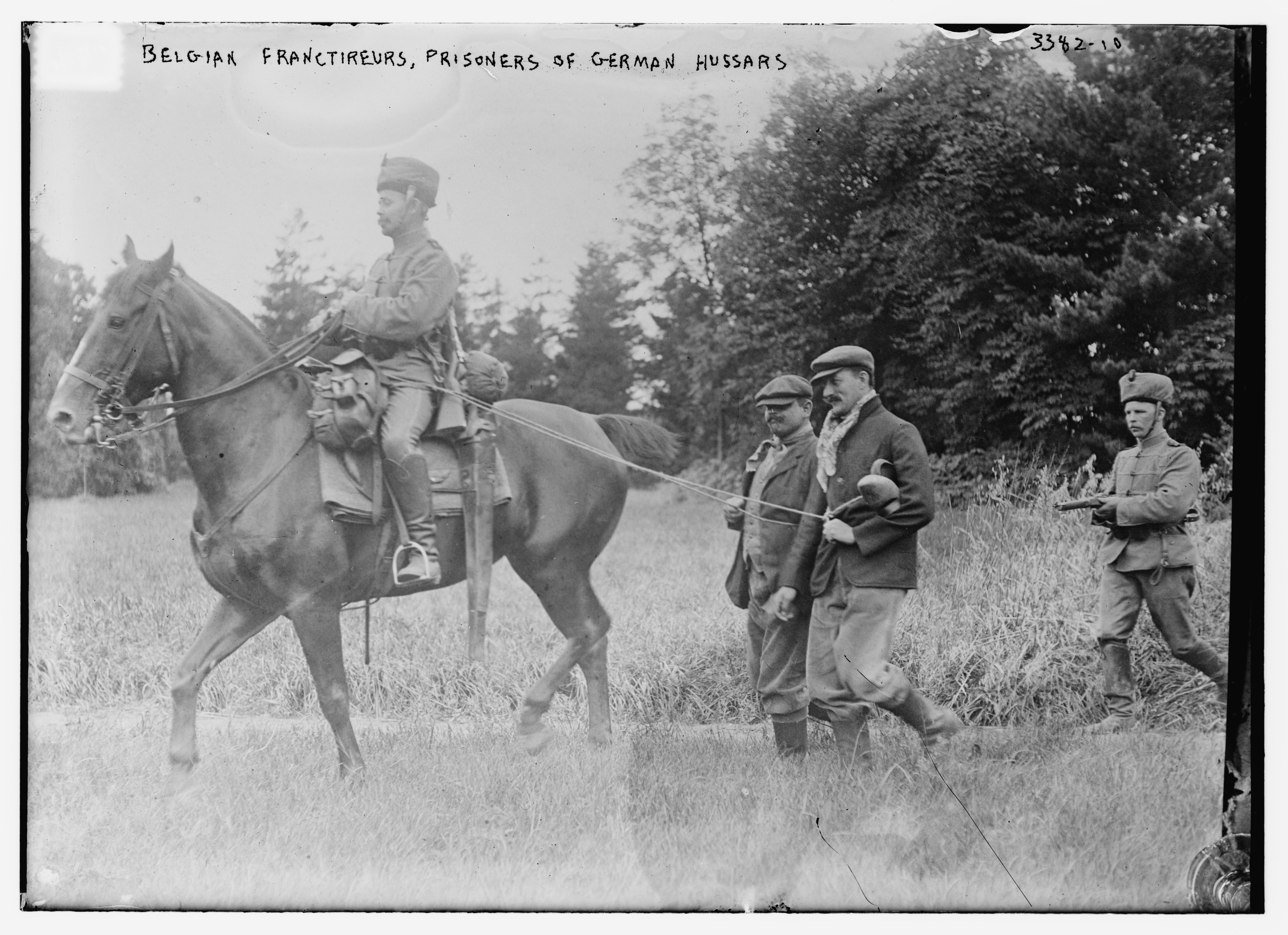
Belgians accused of being "franc-tireurs" being led on a rope by a German Hussar in August or September 1914

The official German explanation for many years was that war crimes in Belgium were in response to guerrilla warfare by the Garde Civique and that the Belgian government was itself to blame for covertly backing such "illegal warfare" in the first place. Echoes of this explanation can be found as late as the 1990s in such works as Deutsche Geschichte of Thomas Nipperdey and in the 1996 edition of the Brockhaus Enzyklopädie. John Horne and Alan Kramer in German Atrocities 1914: A History of Denial contest this. Based on several sources, they contend that the German Army faced no irregular forces in Belgium and France during the first two and a half months of World War I, but believed they did due to erroneous reports of civilian resistance and as a result responded inappropriately and with excessive force.

More recently, however, 21st-century historian Thomas Weber has carefully examined the root causes of the German war crimes committed during the Rape of Belgium, the vast majority of which took place between 18 and 28 August 1914 and which were curtailed by the disciplinary policies the Imperial German Army High Command immediately adopted in response to the global outcry. Acting with the benefit of both hindsight and detachment from the emotions, atrocity propaganda, and political ideologies of the period, Weber alleges that German war crimes in Belgium were not motivated by anti-Catholicism, as even overwhelmingly Catholic units of the Imperial German Army willingly took part. They were also not, as many Sonderweg thesis historians still allege, the natural outgrowth of both German culture and Prussian Army-style militarism, from which a straight line can allegedly be drawn to the Holocaust and the many other Nazi war crimes of World War II.

Even though the German people are traditionally stereotyped as orderly, well-disciplined, and invariably super-efficient, according to Thomas Weber, the real, "situational factors at play", during the August 1914 Rape of Belgium were, "the nervousness and anxiety of hastily mobilized, largely untrained civilians, panic, [and] the slippery slope from requisitioning to looting and pillaging."

According to Thomas Weber, vast numbers of minimally trained, poorly disciplined, and extremely paranoid German soldiers in Belgium, August 1914 saw "franc-tireurs everywhere, with lethal consequences. In many cases of friendly fire directed by German troops on other German troops or on occasions when German troops could not work out the direction of enemy fire, the existence of illegal enemy combatants was immediately assumed with devastating and disastrous results. To make matters worse, the Belgian militia known as the Garde Civique that had been deployed particularly during the first few days of the war (and thus immediately prior to the eleven-day period in which most atrocities took place) did indeed not wear regular uniforms."

== Other uses of this term ==
Outside of World War I, the term Schrecklichkeit is also used in German as the general term for "horror" or "terribleness".

== See also ==
- Destruction of Kalisz
- Rape of Belgium
- Shock and awe
