= German invasion of Belgium =

German invasion of Belgium may refer to:

- German invasion of Belgium (1914) during World War I
- German invasion of Belgium (1940) during World War II
