= Sack of Louvain =

1914–1915 WWI German assault on the Belgian town of Louvain

- Part of the Rape of Belgium
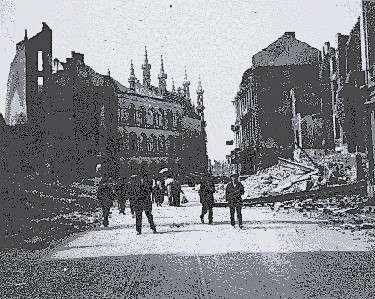
- The city's ruins in 1915
- Location: Louvain (today Leuven)
- Date: 25 August 1914–January 1915
- Target: Belgian civilians
- Attack type: War crime, mass murder, forced labour
- Deaths: 248 death toll
- Victims: 1,500 subjected to forced labour and deported to Germany
- Perpetrator: Imperial German Army

The Sack of Louvain was the German assault on the Belgian town of Louvain (today Leuven), part of the events collectively known as the Rape of Belgium, taking place during the First World War. Over the course of several days of pillaging and brutality, 248 people were killed and 1,500 were deported to Germany where they were held at the Munster internment camp until January 1915. The Library of the Catholic University of Louvain was destroyed after it was set on fire by the occupying German soldiers and 1,120 of the 8,928 homes in Louvain were destroyed.

== Prelude ==
The Imperial German Army, which was dominated by recent volunteers and conscripts who had received minimal military training before being sent into combat, had already committed multiple war crimes since invading Belgium on 4 August 1914, including mass killings of hundreds of civilians as hostages or under suspicion of guerrilla warfare, in Liege, Aarschot, and Andenne. On Tuesday, 18 August, the Belgian Army withdrew from the university town of Louvain; in the morning of the next day, Wednesday, 19 August, German forces—including infantry, artillery, and uhlan cavalry—entered the town, encountering no resistance from the population.

== Events ==
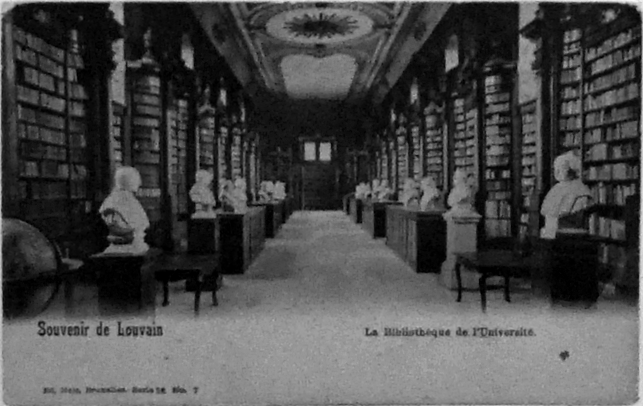
The library of the Catholic University of Louvain in a turn-of-century postcard

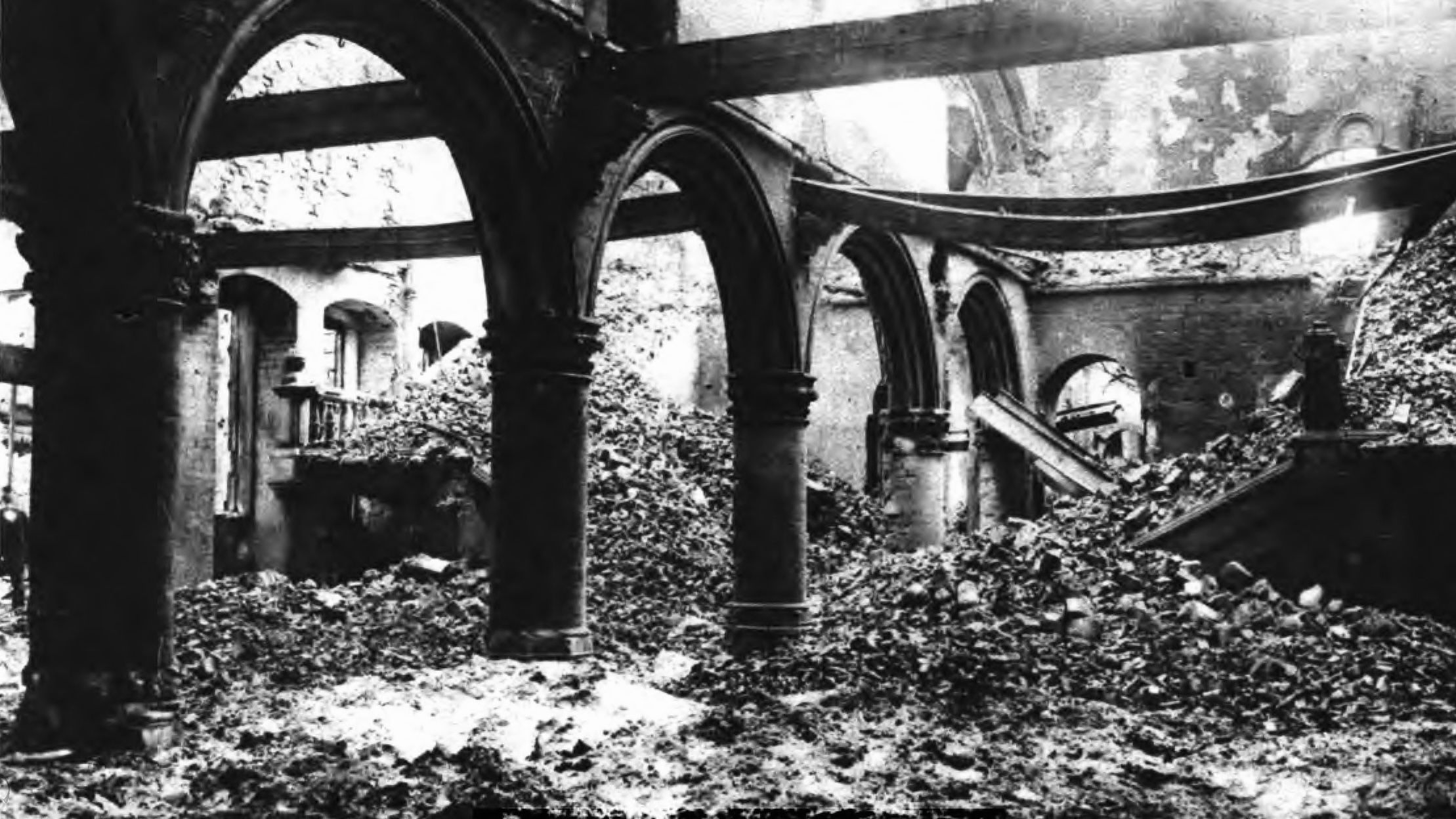
The ruins of the University of Louvain's library after it was burned by the German army in 1914

About 15,000 German troops occupied the town, and from 19 to 22 August, the German 1st Army made its headquarters in Louvain. The Germans took hostages from the municipal administration, magistrates, and the Catholic University of Louvain, and forced inhabitants to keep their front doors open, and windows lit throughout the night.

On 25 August, although they had encountered no resistance from the population, German troops began a massacre. The massacre likely began when a group of German soldiers, panicked by a false report of a major Allied offensive in the area, fired on some fellow German troops. As the German 1st Army panicked further, their discipline evaporated, civilians were shot or bayoneted, homes were set on fire, and some bodies later showed signs of torture. Many of those killed were dumped in ditches and construction trenches.

At around 11:30 pm, German soldiers broke into the university's library (located in the 14th-century cloth hall), which held significant special collections, including medieval manuscripts and books, and set it on fire. Within ten hours, the library and its collection was virtually destroyed. The fire continued to burn for several days. The rector of the American College of Louvain was rescued by Brand Whitlock, the U.S. ambassador, who recorded the rector's account of "the murder, the lust, the looting, the fires, the pillage, the evacuation and the destruction of the city" as well as the arson attack that destroyed the library's incunabula. The burning of the University of Louvain's library caused the destruction of more than 230,000 books, including 750 medieval manuscripts. Personal libraries and the papers of notaries, solicitors, judges, professors, and physicians were also destroyed.

The killings and other acts of brutality took place throughout the next night and day. The day after that, the German army bombarded the town with five shells. The town was thoroughly pillaged, with many German officers and men engaging in looting of money, wine, silver, and other objects of value, while killing those who resisted or did not understand.

In the town, some 1,100 buildings were destroyed, variously estimated to constitute one-sixth or more than one-fifth of the town's structures. Louvain Town Hall was saved because it was already the site of the German headquarters. Some 248 civilians were killed, and most of the city's 42,000 residents were exiled by force into the countryside, with some being taken from their homes at gunpoint. Approximately 1,500 citizens of the town, including women, children, and four of the hostages, were deported to Germany in railway cattle-wagons.

== Legacy ==
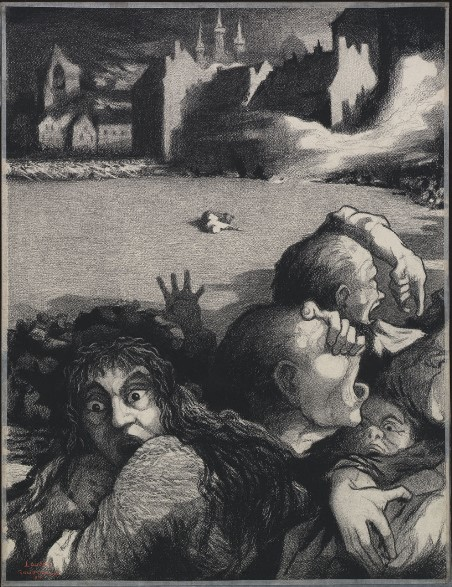
Louvain, by Belgian artist Gisbert Combaz (1916)

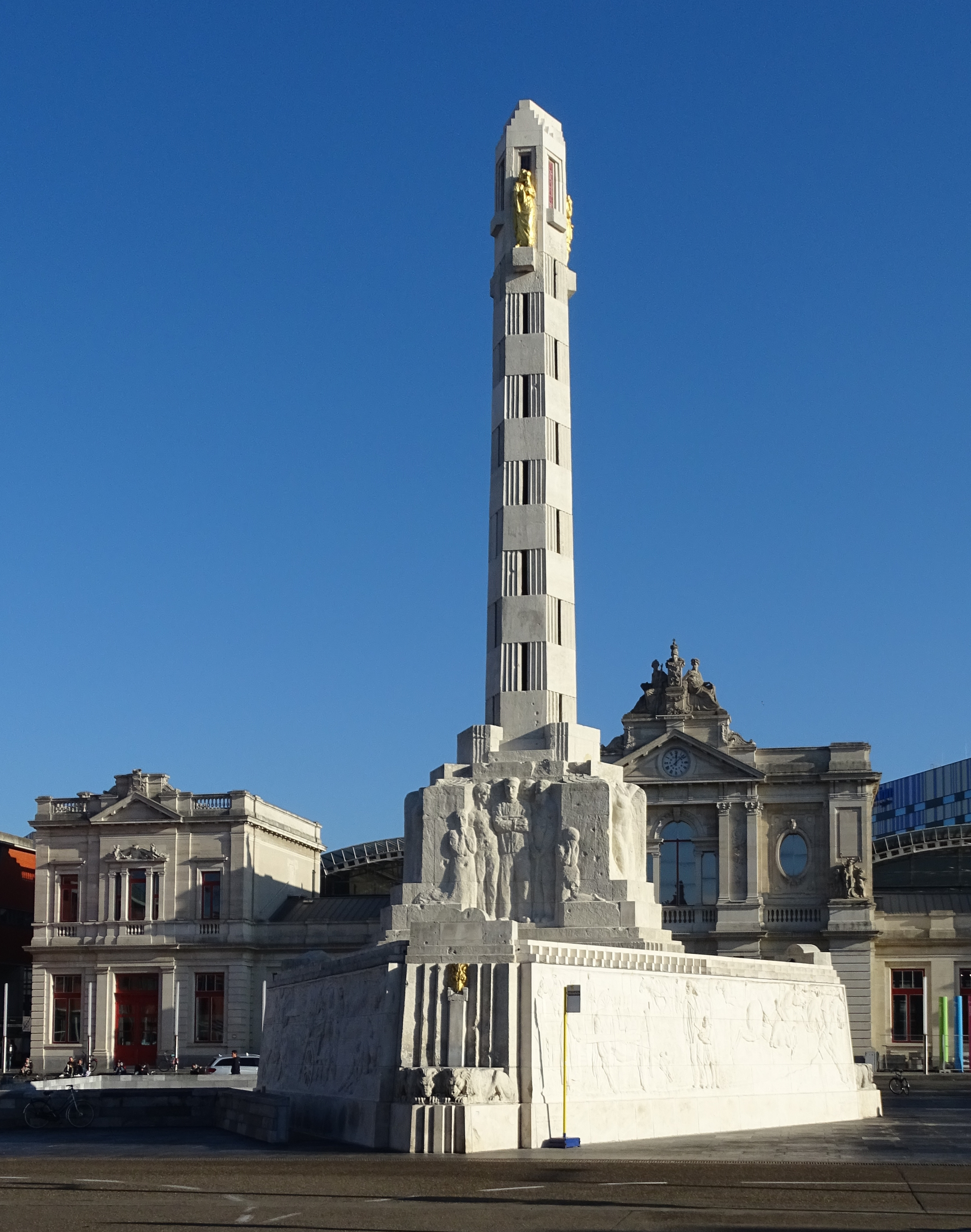
Peace Memorial in Martyrs' Square in Leuven

The German atrocities and the cultural destruction caused worldwide outrage. It greatly harmed Germany's standing in neutral countries. In the United Kingdom, the prime minister, H. H. Asquith, wrote that "the burning of Louvain is the worst thing [the Germans] have yet done. It reminds one of the Thirty Years' War ... and the achievements of Tilly and Wallenstein." The Irish Parliamentary Party, led by John Redmond, condemned the German atrocities. The Daily Mail called it the "Holocaust of Louvain". Intellectuals and journalists in Italy condemned the German act, and it contributed to Italy distancing itself from Germany and Austria and drifting toward the Allies.

According to historian Alfred-Maurice de Zayas, the War Crimes Bureau of the Prussian Ministry of War collected 73-eyewitness depositions about the Sack of Louvain, which were mainly from German officers and enlisted men. The original protocols, according to de Zayas, are more complete and more reliable than the excerpts appearing in The German White Book. The depositions alleged that the German soldiers believed themselves to be under attack by armed Belgian civilians and that the destruction of the city and its cultural heritage took place in the heat of what was thought to be an urban battle against civilian-clothed members of the Belgian Garde Civique. For example, it was alleged that the captured and slain insurgents were not recognized as local residents by any Belgians in Louvain, so they were thought to have been sent from outside the city with orders to stage an anti-German uprising. Furthermore, Georg Berghausen, the 1st Army's chief medical officer, testified that the German soldiers wounded at Louvain had mostly been injured by bullets from hunting guns, rather than being the victims of friendly fire. If Berghausen's testimony was not perjury, in an effort to shield the officers and enlisted men of his division from facing court martial proceedings under German military law, it is intriguing, as the city government of Louvain had ordered the confiscation of all privately owned firearms in early August, believing that civilian resistance was futile and would provoke violent reprisals.

The university was reopened in 1919, and the reconstructed library was inaugurated in 1927. The rector of the university, Paulin Ladeuze, said that "At Louvain, Germany disqualified itself as a nation of thinkers."

More recently, 21st-century historian Thomas Weber has examined the root causes of the German war crimes committed during the Rape of Belgium, the vast majority of which took place between 18 and 28 August 1914 and which were curtailed by the disciplinary policies the Imperial German Army high command immediately adopted in response to the global outcry. Acting with the benefit of both hindsight and detachment from the emotions, atrocity propaganda, and political ideologies of the period, Weber alleges that German war crimes in Belgium were not motivated by anti-Catholicism, as even overwhelmingly Catholic units of the Imperial German Army willingly took part. They were also not, as many Sonderweg-thesis historians still allege, the natural outgrowth of both German culture and Prussian Army-style militarism, from which a straight line can allegedly be drawn to the Holocaust and the many other Nazi war crimes of World War II.

Even though the German people are traditionally stereotyped as orderly, well-disciplined, and invariably super-efficient, according to Weber, the real, "situational factors at play", during the August 1914 Rape of Belgium were, "the nervousness and anxiety of hastily mobilized, largely untrained civilians, panic, [and] the slippery slope from requisitioning to looting and pillaging".

According to Weber, vast numbers of minimally trained, poorly disciplined, and extremely paranoid teenaged German soldiers in August 1914 Belgium saw, "franc-tireurs everywhere, with lethal consequences. In many cases of 'friendly fire' directed by German troops on other German troops or on occasions when German troops could not work out the direction of enemy fire, the existence of illegal enemy combatants was immediately assumed with devastating and disastrous results. To make matters worse, the Belgian Garde Civique—or home guard—that had been deployed particularly during the first few days of the war (and thus immediately prior to the eleven-day period in which most atrocities took place) did indeed not wear regular uniforms."

The destruction of the university library, whether it was an act of poorly trained conscripts whose discipline had imploded, a deliberate act of cultural vandalism, or because, similarly to the bombing of Monte Cassino in 1944, the library buildings were believed to be in secret use for military purposes, still violated Imperial Germany's obligation, as a signatory to the Hague Convention of 1907, that "in sieges and bombardment all necessary steps must be taken to spare, as far as possible, buildings dedicated to religion, art, science, or charitable purposes". For this reason, the Treaty of Versailles, which ended the First World War, included a clause to strengthen protections for cultural property under international law.

A monument was erected in Louvain's municipal square, overlooking a mausoleum with the remains of 138 victims of the sack. The monument features panels by Marcel Wolfers depicting the atrocities that soldiers from the German 1st Army perpetrated against the civilian population of Louvain following the collapse of their military discipline. The mausoleum was unveiled in 1925 by former Supreme Allied Commander Marshal Ferdinand Foch, before an audience that included Queen Elisabeth and Cardinal Désiré-Joseph Mercier.

== See also ==
- Blutmai
- Burning of Cork
- Destruction of Kalisz
- Lwów pogrom (1914)
- Siege of Tsingtao
