= Destruction of Kalisz =

Sacking of a Polish City during WW1

Coordinates: 51.7625°N 18.0903°E

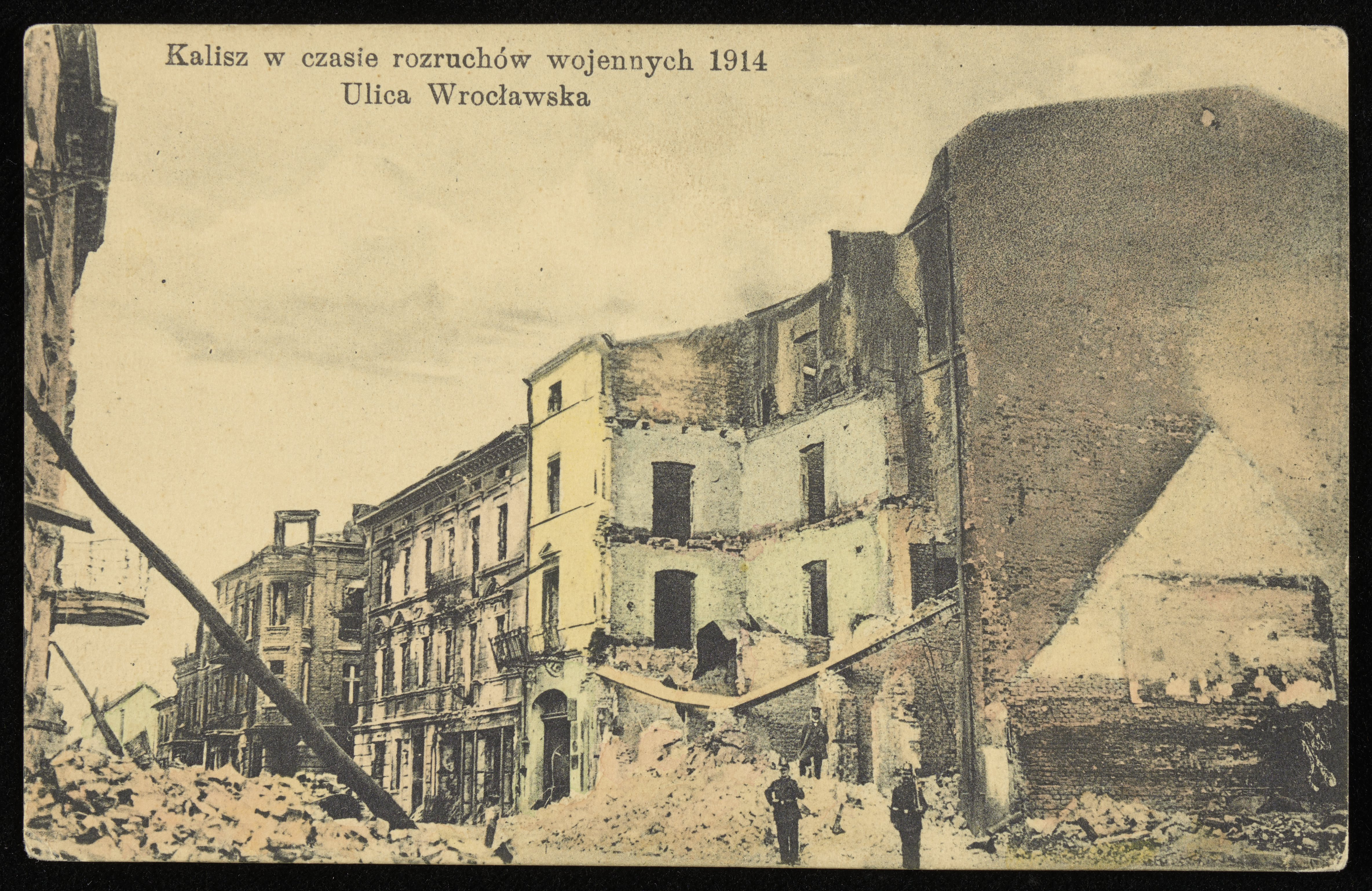
Wrocławska Street

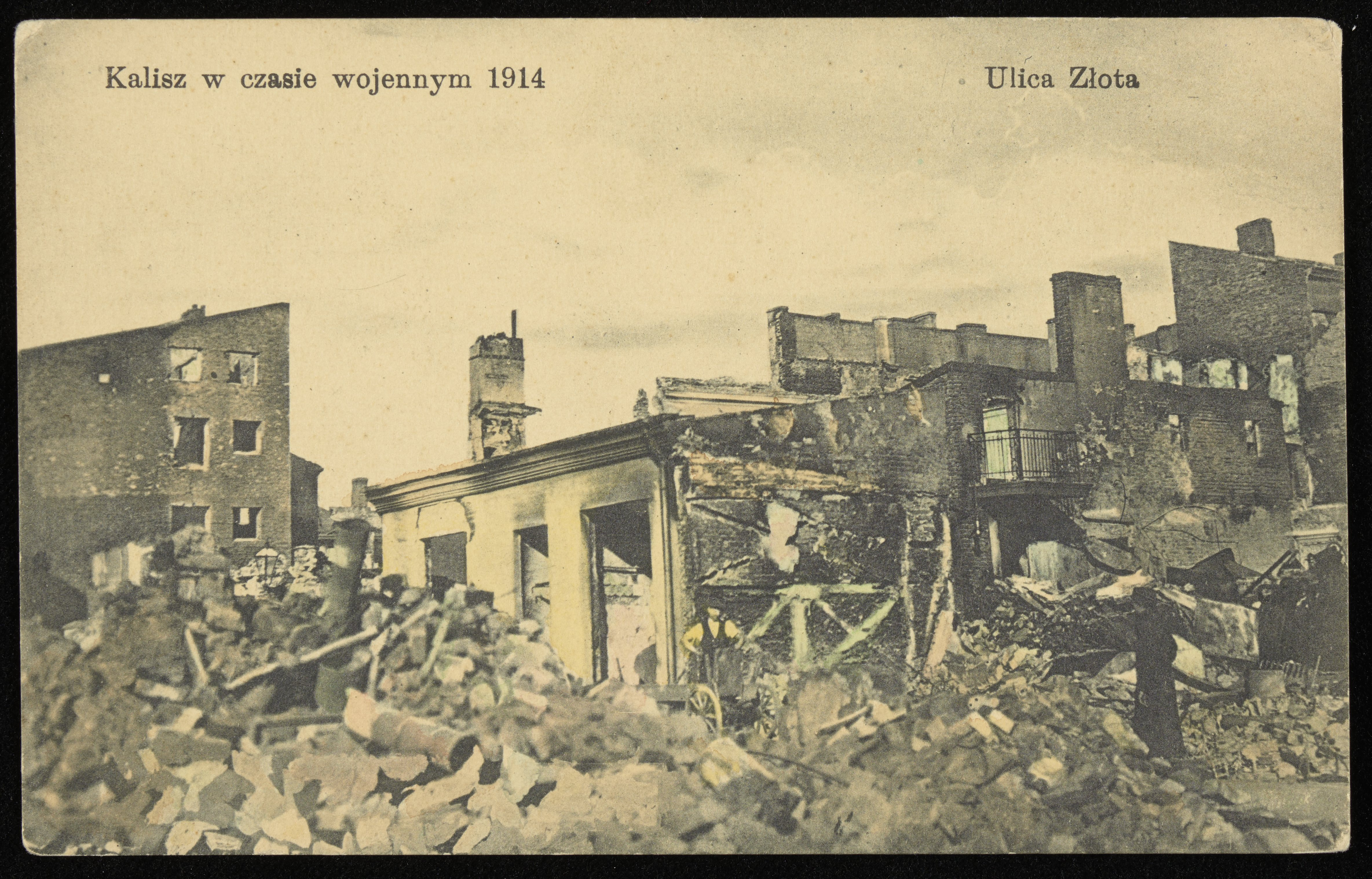
Złota Street

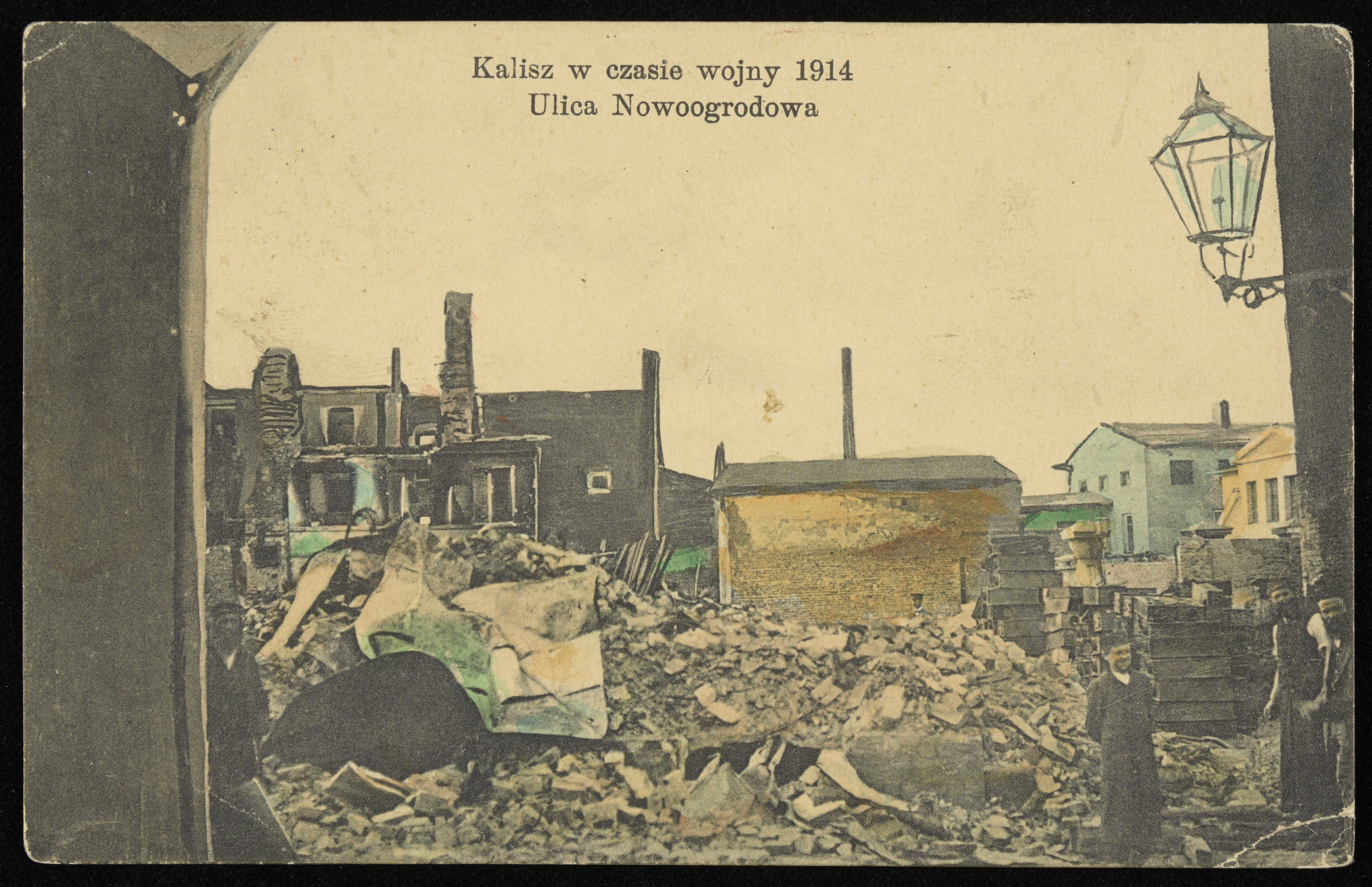
Nowoogrodowa Street

The destruction of Kalisz (Polish: zburzenie Kalisza) by German troops took place from 2 August until 22 August 1914 at the beginning of World War I. The event is also known as the Pogrom of Kalisz or Poland's Louvain.

The German army invaded Kalisz on 2 August 1914. The town was burnt down; only churches and public offices survived. A significant number of citizens were shot. Prior to the war, Kalisz had 65,000 inhabitants. Afterwards, it was left with 5,000 inhabitants.

== Background ==
On 13 February 1793, Kalisz and the Kalisz region became part of Prussia during the Second Partition of Poland. In 1807 it was regained by Poles and included within the short-lived Polish Duchy of Warsaw. After Napoleon's defeat on the Eastern front in 1812, it was taken over and then annexed by Imperial Russia, which subsequently controlled the city for more than 100 years.

=== Outbreak of World War I ===
==== The Russians pull out ====
The first inclination of the war reaching Kalisz was when the nearby border with the German Empire was closed at Nowe Skalmierzyce (then officially Neu Skalmierschütz in the Prussian Partition of Poland) and rail movements across the border to Germany were stopped. Russian officials began evacuating the city alongside military personnel. On August 2, 1914, at dawn, the Russian military retreated from the city without fighting, after setting fire to military warehouses near the railway station. It was set on fire as well as the trains and transport wagons. A civic committee was established by the citizens of the town which began to administer the city. Additionally, the Civil Guard was established to keep order, while workers tried to put the fire at the railway station out.

== The Germans move in ==
=== First German soldiers appear ===
Around 14:00, on August 2, the first German patrols appeared along the railway tracks. As the patrols increased, crowds gathered. Altogether the atmosphere was neutral, some unfavourable comments could be heard from among the citizens of Kalisz. When a German officer arrived, mayor Bukowiński gave him the keys to the city as a symbolic gesture. After ensuring that there were no Russian forces present, the German patrols withdrew to Szczypiorno. In later hours, other German soldiers started to arrive on bicycles. Many of them were Poles from the nearby town of Ostrzeszów (then officially Schildberg in the Prussian Partition of Poland), and there was no hostility between them and the local Polish population. The German soldiers of Polish extraction (about 30 in number), quickly separated from the rest of the Germans and went to the market, where they engaged in conversation with the local population and drank beer with them. German soldiers remained separated and struggled to engage in conversations which were carried out in Polish.

=== Arrival of the main German forces ===
Only on the night of 2 and 3 of August around midnight, did the main German forces come from the Fifth Company of the 155th regiment of infantry in Ostrowo. The commander, Captain Keild, demanded lodgings for his troops and summoned the mayor. On the same night, forces of Major Hermann Preusker came to the city from the 2nd Battalion of infantry. Preusker immediately took over and named himself the commandant. At the selection of quarters, Preusker showed great displeasure and demanded the building housing the Musical Society and Christian Craftsmen in the city instead of the Russian military barracks.

At dawn on 3 August, mortars were brought into the city. At the same time, Major Preusker started arguing with the city council, although they had fulfilled his every request. Some believed he was disappointed with the lack of resistance and the indifferent attitude to German soldiers by the Polish population, which had begun to establish personal connections with the ethnic Polish soldiers from the German-controlled part of the partitioned country. Some of those soldiers did not show any support for the war and even condemned the conflict.

== Executions and repression ==
In the late evening, a single shot was heard, which began panic and confusion among the city population; it was followed by machine gun fire. After this short event, peace returned to the area. During the night the firing resumed, when German soldiers started to shoot at each other, probably thinking that they were surrounded by Russian forces. Although the civilians stayed at home, 21 of them and six soldiers were dead and 32 soldiers were wounded. Major Preusker claimed that it was the local population that carried out the shooting.

On August 4, Preusker took six citizens as hostages, 50,000 rubles of retribution, a curfew, a ban on publishing newspapers, and threatened to take further hostages and executions. Despite this, the Germans continued with further repression and executions. Civilians were brutally beaten, often with rifle butts; at any sign of resistance, people were shoved against a wall and shot. Many executions happened near the hospital where wounded people were taken. Several corpses were left in the street. Pedestrians were mistreated and any signs of opposition were quelled with such brutality and under such conditions that there were cases where soldiers refused to follow the orders of their officers. Up to 20 people were murdered in this way.

== Shelling and raids into the city ==
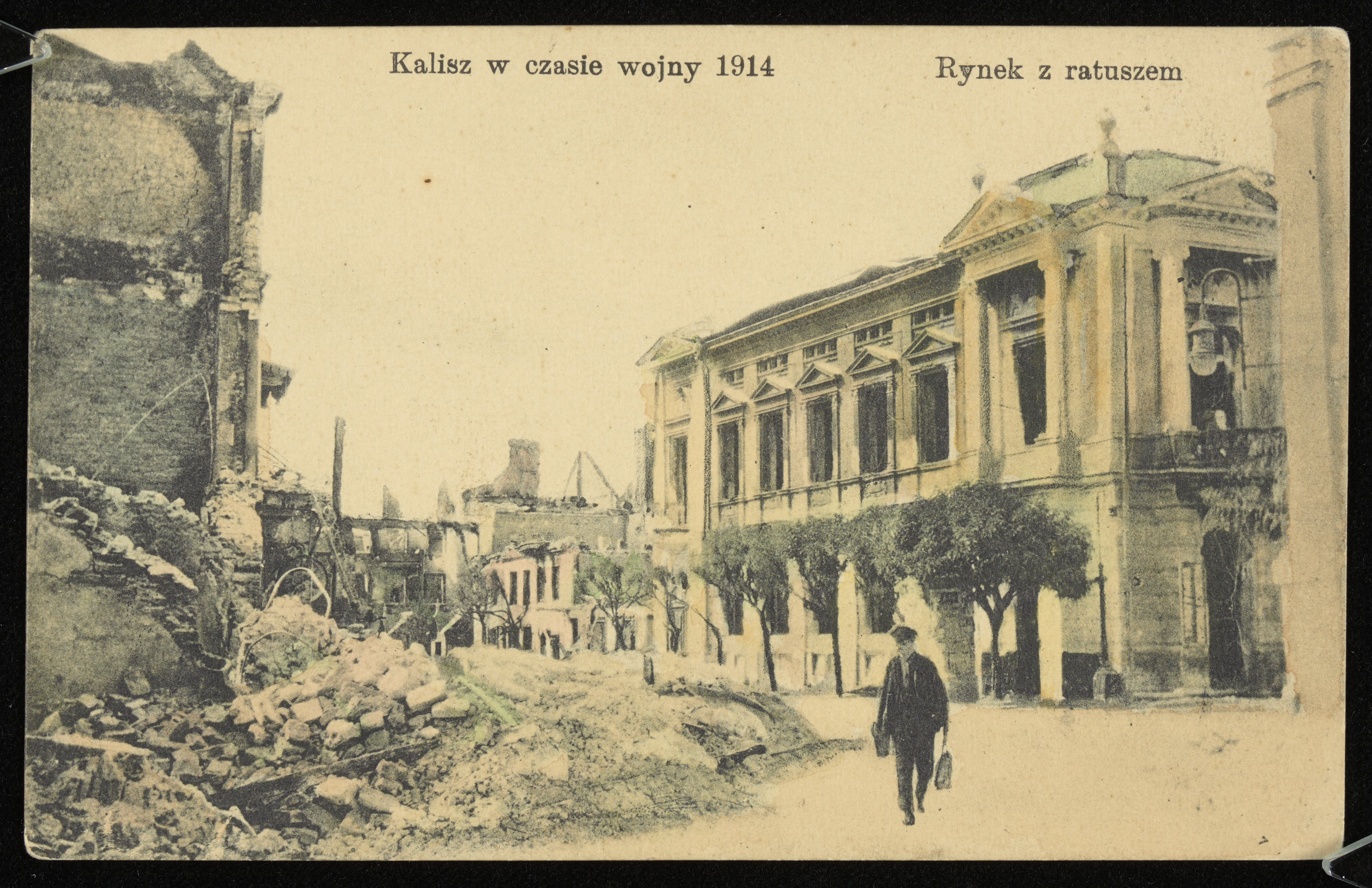
Market Square

After taking their hostages with them, the Germans started to retreat from the city in late afternoon. An hour later, artillery fire was laid down on the city from nearby hills. It was very efficient as Kalisz is located in a deep valley. Additionally, the Germans had ordered the day before that all citizens should illuminate their homes, which helped in directing the fire. This continued for several days, with the Germans staging short raids into the city. As the shelling started fires, general panic broke out, and even as the Germans threatened to kill anybody escaping, people tried to escape by whatever means they had. Large crowds of panic-stricken people, including children and the elderly with any possessions they could grab, were running from the city, which became almost deserted. On August 5, 10,000 people fled the shelled town. The Germans took additional hostages, mistreating them and even killing some. Only after the intervention of the Catholic Church, were some released and others sent to POW camps in Cottbus in Germany.

== Massacre of civilian population ==
As the situation seemed to calm down, new forces from Saxony arrived, while Major Preusker's soldiers were withdrawn. Another incident happened on August 7 on Main Market Square, when a lone horse ran free; as a result, German soldiers started shooting in a disorganised way, which led to the death of some of them. Artillery was positioned within the city and the Germans fired at civilian buildings for over an hour. About 100 civilians died in this incident. The Germans searched for survivors and when they found them, they stabbed them to death with bayonets.

During the afternoon, City Hall was set on fire, and officials executed. The Germans retreated and shooting began again, which continued overnight between 7 and 8 August. On Saturday morning, the Germans returned to the city, taking 800 men prisoner and executing 80 of them on a nearby hill. The following day, the Germans started to systematically burn down the city. It is mentioned that in cases where civilians tried to fight the fire, they were murdered by German soldiers.

The shootings, murders, plunder of shops and homes as well as the burning down of the whole city lasted until 22 August, when the last home was set alight on Nowoogrodowska street.

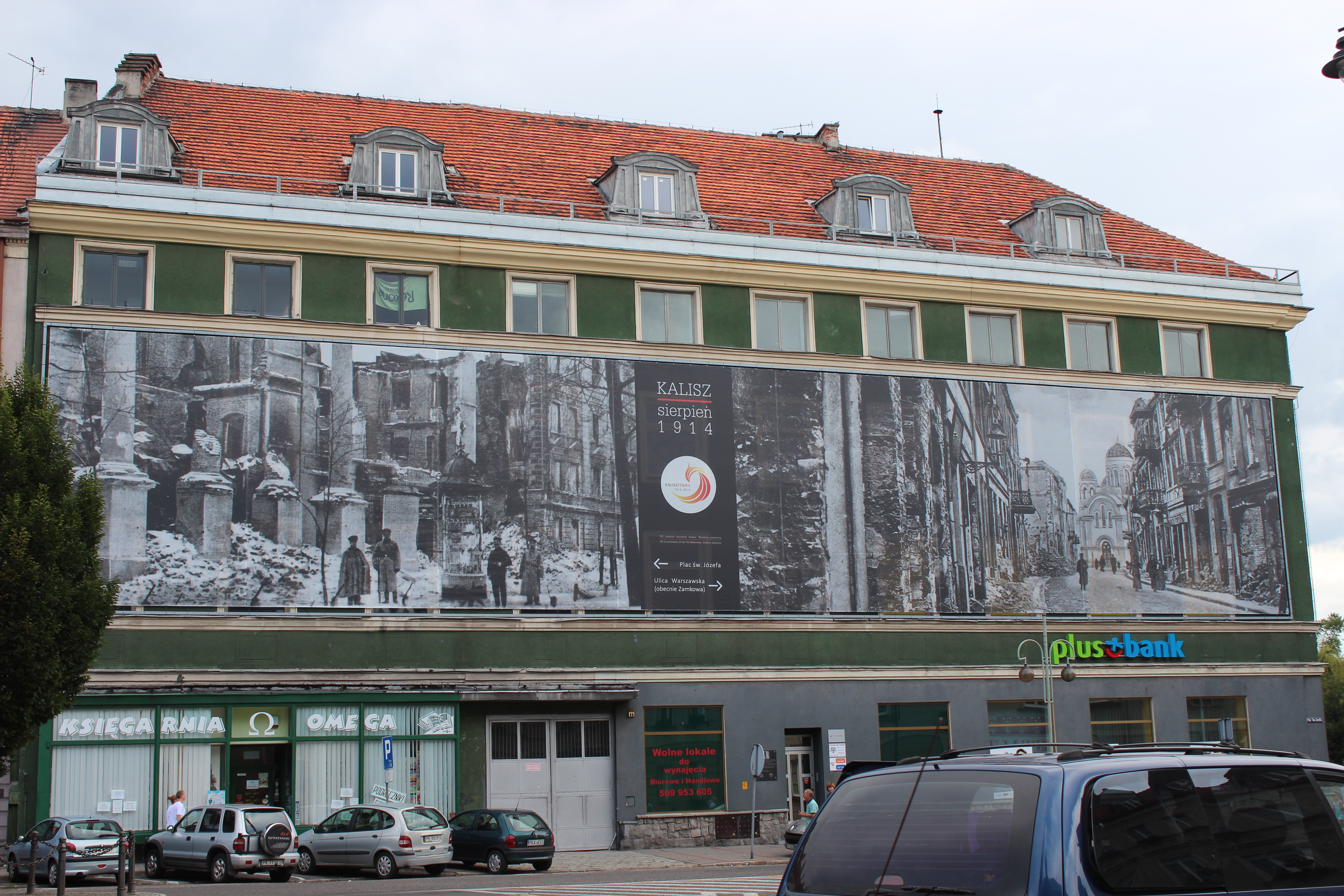
Commemoration in Kalisz in 2014

The Polish press in all territories of then partitioned Poland reported extensively on the event, some calling it "monstrous madness, that is unbelievable". The damage in Kalisz constituted 29.5% of the losses in the entire Congress Poland during World War I. The destruction has been compared to the Sack of Louvain, where a Belgian city was destroyed in similar manner by the Germans. Before the war Kalisz had 65,000 citizens; after the war, there were only 5,000 left.

== See also ==
- Sack of Louvain
- Expulsion of Poles by Germany
- Planned destruction of Warsaw
- Rape of Belgium
- Schrecklichkeit
- Mitteleuropa
- Scorched earth

== Notes and references ==
Inline

Offline

1. H. Wrotkowski, "Społeczeństwo Kalisza w latach pierwszej wojny światowej i dniach wyzwolenia." Rocznik Kaliski, vol. 3, 1970, p. 165-174
2. T. Zarębska, "Sprawa odbudowy zabytkowego centrum Kalisza." Rocznik Kaliski vol. 10, 1977, p. 121-177
3. Cz. Łuczak, "Dzieje gospodarcze Niemiec 1871-1949." Poznań 1984, p. 48 8 H. Batowski, "Rozpad Austro-Węgier 1914-1918." Kraków 1982, p. 19
4. J. Desmarest, "La Grande Guerre 1914 - 1918." Paris 1978, p. 184
5. D. Gayer, "Der russiche Imperialismus Politik 1860 - 1914." Góttinggen 1977, p. 195-196
6. T. Nałęcz, "Polska organizacja wojskowa 1914 - 1918." Wrocław 1984, pp. 13, 21
7. A. Garlicki, "Józef Piłsudski 1867 - 1935." Warsaw 1990, pp. 163–176
8. A. Garlicki, "U źródeł obozu belwederskiego." Warsaw 1983, pp. 249, 282
9. J. Krasuski, Historia Rzeszy Niemieckiej. Poznań 1986, p. 228
10. M. Młynarska, "Proces lokacji Kalisza w XIII i w pierwszej połowie XIV w." XVIII wieków Kalisza. Poznań 1960, vol. 1, p. 108
11. J.A. Gierowski, Historia Polski 1764 - 1864. Warsaw 1983, p. 35, 101
12. E. Polanowski, "Maria Dąbrowska - w krainie dzieciństwa i młodości." Poznań 1989, p. 204.
13. M. Dąbrowska, Noce i dnie. Wiatr w oczy, ch. 2. Warsaw 1972, p. 360
14. M. Dąbrowska, Rzemiennym dyszlem. Pisma rozproszone. vol. 1, Kraków 1964, p. 95
15. "Kalisz - 1914." Materiały źródłowe red. M. Lisiecka i K. Pawlak, p. 3, Kalisz 1980
16. M. Dąbrowska, "Przygody człowieka myślącego." Warsaw 1972 p. 105
17. M. Wrotkowska, "Sprawozdanie z sesji popularne-naukowej w dniu 20.10.1984 r. Siedemdziesiąta rocznica zburzenia Kalisza." Referat H. Wrotkowskiego. Rocznik Kaliski vol. 19, 1986, p. 329
18. L.J. Flockerzie: Poland's Louvain. Documents on the Destruction of Kalisz, August 1914. The Polish Review Nr 4/1983 p. 73-88; also: H. Nowaczyk, "Odwet za bunt wojenny?" Południowa Wielkopolska 1989 nr 3 and: "W świetle konwencji Haskiej." Południowa Wielkopolska 1989 nr 4
19. J. Zakrzewska, "Odbudowa Kalisza po wielkiej wojnie." Kalisz 1936, pp. 17, 18
20. Verzeichnis der in August 1914 abgebrannten Grundstu'cke in Kalisch. Deutscher Kreischef in Kalisch. Archiwum Państwowe w Kaliszu, sygn. 117, k. 302-306
21. H. Nowaczyk, "Artykuł 247 Traktatu Wersalskiego." Ziemia Kaliska 1991
22. J. Janczak, "Stosunki ludnościowe." Dzieje Kalisza. Poznań 1977, p. 332
23. "Zabytki Urbanistyki i Architektury w Polsce." Odbudowa i konserwacja. vol. 1, Miasta historyczne. Warsaw 1986, p. 168
24. Archiwum Państwowe w Kaliszu, "Deutscher Kreischef in Kalisch," sygn. 117, k. 302, Verzeichnis der im August 1914 abgebrannten Grundstucke in Kalisch (Spis spalonych nieruchomości w Kaliszu w sierpniu 1914 r.)

== Sources and recommended reading ==
- L.J. Flockerzie: "Poland's Louvain. Documents on the Destruction of Kalisz, August 1914". The Polish Review Nr 4/1983
- Two photos documenting the scale of destruction of Kalisz and following reconstruction
- Na zgliszczach Kalisza: ku wiecznej pamiątce pogromu teutońskiego, dokonanego przez Prusaków w sierpniu 1914 r Bronisław Tomczyk Press, 1915
