= Garde Civique =

Belgian militia

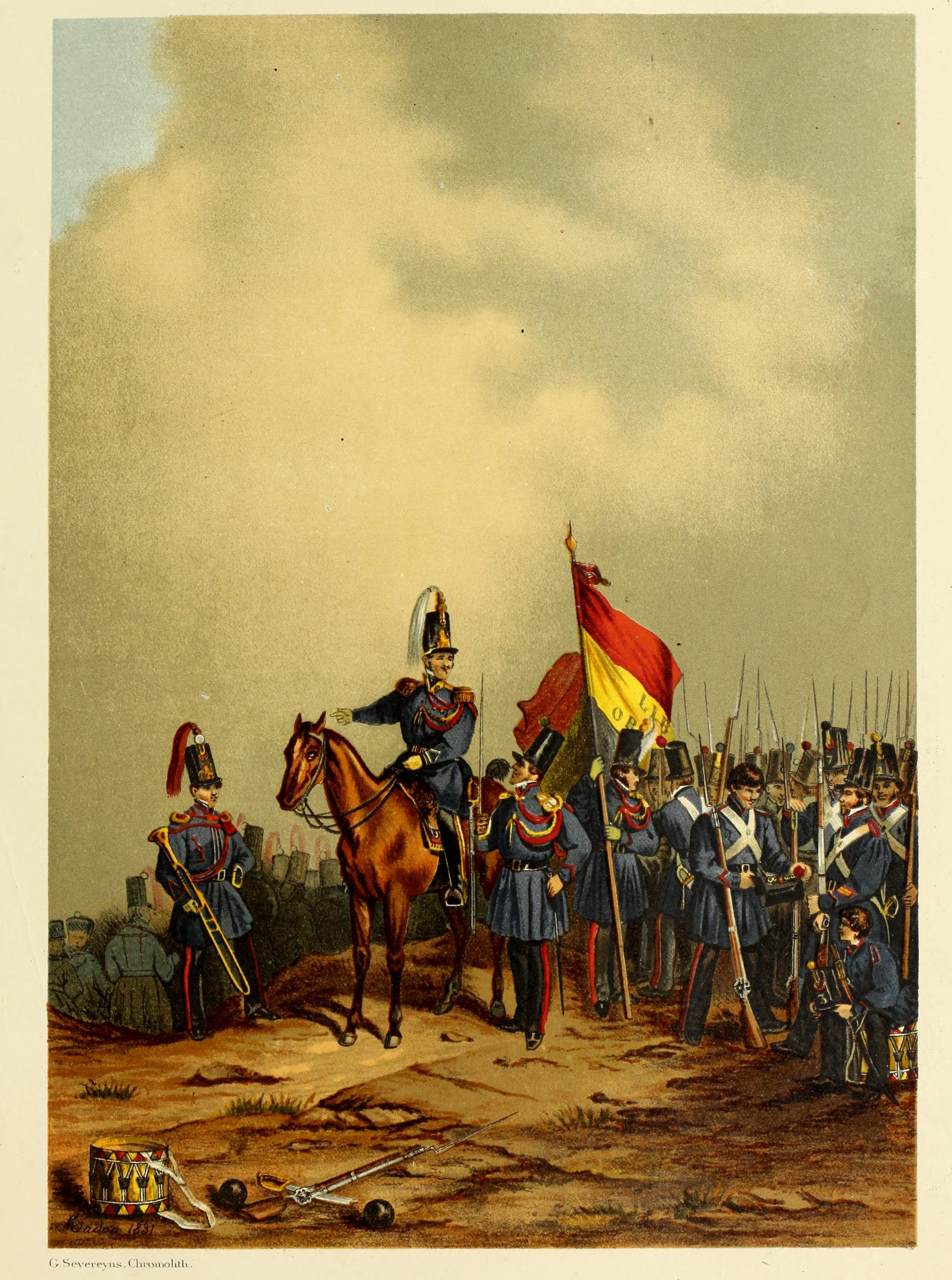
Painting of the Garde Civique at the end of the Belgian Revolution of 1831 by Jean-Baptiste Madou

The Garde Civique or Burgerwacht (French and Dutch; "Civic Guard") was a Belgian paramilitary militia which existed between 1830 and 1920. Created in October 1830 shortly after the Belgian Revolution, the Guard amalgamated the various militia groups which had been created by the middle classes to protect property during the political uncertainty. Its role was as a quasi-military "gendarmerie", with the primary role of maintaining social order within Belgium. Increasingly anachronistic, it was demobilised in 1914 and officially disbanded in 1920, following a disappointing performance during the German invasion of Belgium in World War I.

== Organisation ==
The Garde was organized at a local level, originally in all communes with more than 30,000 inhabitants. Subsequently this "constitutional force" was limited to those towns having a population of 10,000 or more. More thinly populated communities did not have this obligation unless subject to special legislation.

It was composed of citizens aged between 21 and 50 who did not already have military obligations as serving soldiers or reservists. Those aged between 21 and 32 were required to undertake training ten times annually, while the second class (aged 33–50) were obliged only to register their addresses at regular intervals. A third class was composed of older volunteers, who were not equipped, uniformed or armed and were expected only to provide support functions in their local regions. The Garde Civique was, in peacetime, the responsibility of the Ministry of the Interior rather than the Ministry of War. It was distinct from the Belgian Gendarmerie (Rijkswacht) which formed part of the military.

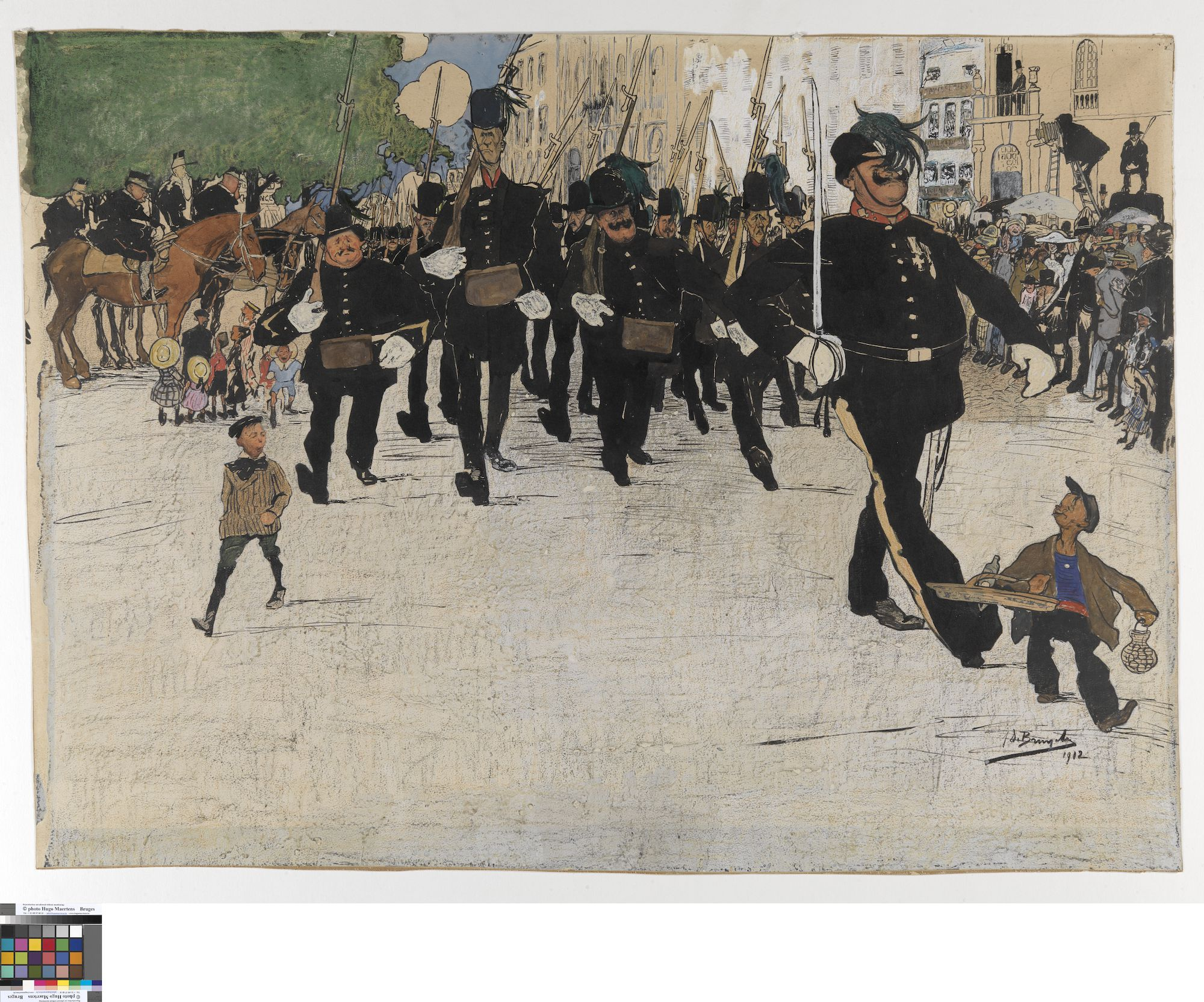
1912 caricature of the Garde Civique on parade in the city of Ghent by the artist Jules De Bruycker.

Most of the Garde units were infantry but there were some artillery and mounted detachments. On the eve of World War I the Garde Civique included 33 companies of chasseurs-à-pied (light infantry), 17 batteries of artillery, 4 squadrons of chasseurs-à-cheval (light horse) and 3 companies of sapeurs-pompiers (armed firemen). About half of these special corps were concentrated in the urban areas of Brussels, Antwerp, Ghent and Liège, reflecting the historic role of the Garde as a force to maintain civil order.

The mounted component of the Garde Civique were retained primarily for ceremonial purposes and were armed only with sabres and revolvers. The Liège Company of the chasseurs-à-cheval were however issued with carbines at the time of the German invasion in August 1914 and served as infantry in defence of the city.

== Purpose ==
The stated purpose of the Garde was to maintain order and preserve the independence and integrity of Belgium. It was anticipated that in the event of invasion the Civic Guard would be mobilised as part of the national defence, upon the passing of legislation by parliament.

During the 19th century these "civic soldiers" had frequently been employed to control strikes or disorders. Membership in infantry units located in urban areas was in principle obligatory for adult men who could afford their own uniforms and had not served in the regular army. The more prestigious cavalry and artillery units were made up of volunteers, usually from affluent classes.

== Uniform and equipment ==
Each regional unit of the Garde had its own dark blue or green uniform, generally following the pattern of those worn by the regular army but with a number of variations. Infantry wore a wide brimmed hat with plume, cavalry a fur busby and artillery a shako. Officers followed the same system of ranks and insignia as the army but traditionally substituted silver braiding and badges for the gold/bronze of the regulars.

The 40,700 civil guardsmen serving in the active portion ("1st Ban") of the force were required to provide their own uniforms. Weapons, leather equipment and items such as drums and bugles were all issued from central stocks held by the Ministry of the Interior.

== Role in World War I ==
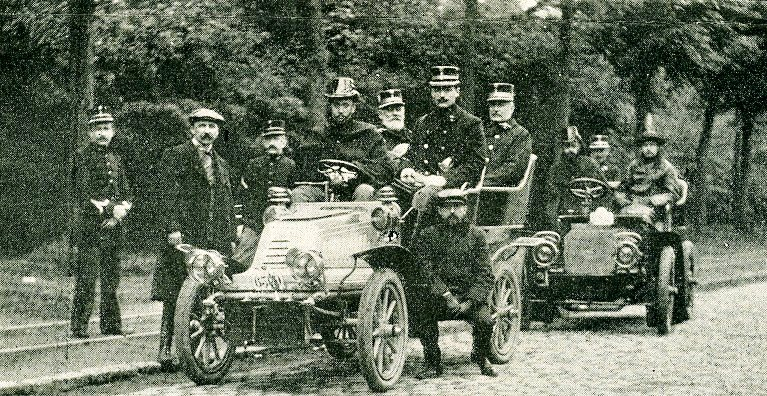
Motorised personnel of the Garde, 1904

The Garde Civique were mobilised following the German invasion of Belgium on 4 August 1914. Their intended functions were to secure lines of communication, guard bridges and other installations, escort prisoners and maintain order outside the actual areas of combat. The German military authorities however chose to regard members of the Garde as franc-tireurs (irregulars) and, as such, not under the protection of international law if taken prisoner. Demands were made that they be disarmed and disbanded. In view of the German shooting of Belgian civilian hostages during the early stages of the invasion such threats were taken seriously and on 13 October 1914 King Albert I decreed the dissolution of the Garde. Most of its younger members transferred to the regular Belgian Army.

The German threat to execute captured members of the Garde was not in the event acted on. While a number were held in prisoner of war camps all had been released by 1915.

== Final disbandment ==
Upon entering liberated Belgium territory in October 1918, King Albert was reportedly met by a saluting veteran of the Garde Civique in full-dress uniform who had kept his equipment and rifle hidden during the four years of German occupation. Such incidents could not however avoid the reality that the Garde had proven to be of limited military use and was no longer required for the role of ensuring social order that had been its prime purpose during the 19th century. The force was accordingly formally disbanded in 1920.

== See also ==
- Gendarmerie (Rijkswacht), a military police force in Belgium active from 1830 and disbanded in 1992.
- Force Publique, a comparable quasi-military police force in Congo Free State and Belgian Congo.
