= Thomas Weber (historian) =

German-born academic and writer

- Born: April 29, 1974 (age 52); Hagen, Germany
- Occupations: Historian, writer

Thomas Weber (born 29 April 1974) is a German-born history professor and university lecturer. Since 2013 he has been Professor of History and International Affairs at the University of Aberdeen. He is known for his books on Adolf Hitler.

== Early life and academic profession ==
Thomas Weber was born in 1974 in Hagen, near Dortmund, in the Southwest corner of the Ruhr valley of North Rhine-Westphalia in what was still West Germany. From 1986 to 1993, he attended the Anne Frank High School in Halver. From 1993 to 1996, Weber studied History, English and Law at the University of Münster, and from 1996 to 1998 Modern History at the University of Oxford, where he earned his Ph.D. in history under the supervision of Niall Ferguson in 2003. He has held fellowships or taught University courses at Harvard University, the Institute for Advanced Study in Princeton, New Jersey, the University of Pennsylvania, the University of Chicago, and the University of Glasgow. He took a teaching position at the University of Aberdeen in September 2008. The focus of his research and teaching expertise lies in European, international, and global political history.

Since 2010, Weber has been director of the Centre for Global Security and Governance at the University of Aberdeen, and since 2013 Professor of History and International Affairs. From 2012 to 2013 he was a Fritz-Thyssen-Fellow at Harvard University's Weatherhead Center for International Affairs. Since 2013, he has been a guest researcher at the Center for European Studies at Harvard University. Weber is visiting Fellow at the Hoover Institution.

== 2010 Book: Hitler's First War and responses ==
In his book Hitler's First War: Adolf Hitler, the Men of the List Regiment, and the First World War, Weber paints a very "different picture of Private Hitler" than his self-mythologising account in Mein Kampf. Weber based his research on the previously unseen archives of his Regiment and Division, which survived Allied bombing raids on Munich during the Second World War, and the many extant letters and diaries by other Imperial German Army soldiers serving in the Bavarian List Regiment. These sources reveal, in contradiction to Hitler's later claims to have been a brave and highly respected front line soldier in the trench warfare of the Western Front, that he served mainly at Division headquarters and only arrived at the front line when he was dispatched on high risk missions to deliver sealed orders. Hitler was accordingly viewed by frontline soldiers as an Etappenschwein (or "rear area pig"), a German military slang term meaning a soldier with a relatively safe assignment with regularly cleaned bedsheets far away from actual combat. This term is traditionally used very similarly to how the acronym REMF (meaning "Rear Echelon Mother Fucker") was used by United States military personnel during the Vietnam War.

In response to what he considered the anti-German and overly simplistic efforts of other historians to claim that anti-Semitism and Nazi ideology were always at the core of German culture, Weber's use of primary sources made him able to demonstrate that German Jewish frontline soldiers, unlike Private Hitler, were actually very well-liked within the List Regiment and remained friends with their fellow veterans for decades after the Armistice. Weber also argued that the movement towards a more democratic government that began under Imperial Germany and continued under the Weimar Republic was never pre-determined in 1919 to fail as catastrophically as became the case in 1933. According to Weber, "The story of how Private Hitler managed to transform himself from a 'rear area pig', shunned by the men of his regiment, to the most powerful right wing dictator of the twentieth century is thus a cautionary tale for all democratizing and democratized countries. If de-democratization could happen in interwar Germany, it can arguable happen anywhere."

After the book was published, Weber was approached by the family of a German-American doctor with new information regarding Hitler's medical history. This testimony refutes some of the key tenets of Nazi propaganda and casts further doubt what was long considered the official history about the origins of Hitler's hatred of Jews. It gained further credence when he was contacted by the son of Bernhard Lustig, a German Jewish combat veteran of Hitler's regiment, also following the publication of Hitler's First War. Lustig's memoirs provide "independent and compelling confirmation of the book's findings about Hitler and his regiment's wartime attitude toward Jews, as well as Hitler's character during the war," Dr. Weber said. The post-war testimony of Lustig, who served as a lieutenant colonel in the regiment, confirms that Hitler did not display any leadership qualities during the war and that, as an introvert, Hitler never attended parties at the regimental headquarters. In a testimony given in 1961, he also reported that he was friends with one of Hitler's battalion commanders, who once confessed to Lustig that he would never promote Hitler because he 'could not stand him'. Unlike Hitler, Lustig met regularly with veterans of the List regiment after the war. During these meetings, many officers expressed their shock and surprise at Hitler's sudden appearance as a political "leader".

For several years, various producers have attempted to adapt Hitler’s First War into a TV mini-series. The project was considered by the Berlin-based UFA-Fiction and Beta Film as a limited 10-episode series. Simply called Hitler, it would have traced Hitler’s life from his service as a soldier in World War I until his rise to power. However, as of 2023, the series has still not been produced.

== Awards ==
- The 2004 Golden Light Award in the category of “Best Edited Historical Book” for his first book, Lodz Ghetto Album
- The 2005 Infinity Award in the category of "Publication" for the International Center of Photography for Lodz Ghetto Album
- The 2008 Duc d’Arenberg History Prize for the best book on European history and culture for his second book, Our Friend “The Enemy”
- The 2010 recipient of the Arthur Goodzeit Book Award of the New York Military Affairs Symposium for the best book on military history for his third book, Hitler's First War

== Books ==
- Lodz Ghetto Album: Photographs by Henryk Ross, edited by Timothy Prus and Martin Parr, foreword by John Jan van Pelt, published by Chris Booth, London, 2004, ISBN 0-9542813-7-3
- Our Friend "The Enemy": Elite Education in Britain and Germany before World War I, Stanford University Press, Stanford, CA, 2008, ISBN 978-0-8047-0014-6
- Hitler's First War: Adolf Hitler, the Men of the List Regiment, and the First World War, Oxford University Press, Oxford, UK, 2010, ISBN 978-0-19-923320-5
  - German edition: Hitlers erster Krieg. Der Gefreite Hitler im Weltkrieg – Mythos und Wahrheit. Propyläen, Berlin 2011, ISBN 978-3-549-07405-3; Paperback: List, Berlin 2012, ISBN 978-3-548-61110-5
- Wie Adolf Hitler zum Nazi wurde, Berlin, 2016, ISBN 978-3-549-07432-9
  - English edition: Becoming Hitler: The Making of a Nazi, Basic Books, 2017, ISBN 978-0-465-03268-6
