= Couillet Treaty =

Payment imposed in 1914 on Charleroi, Belgium

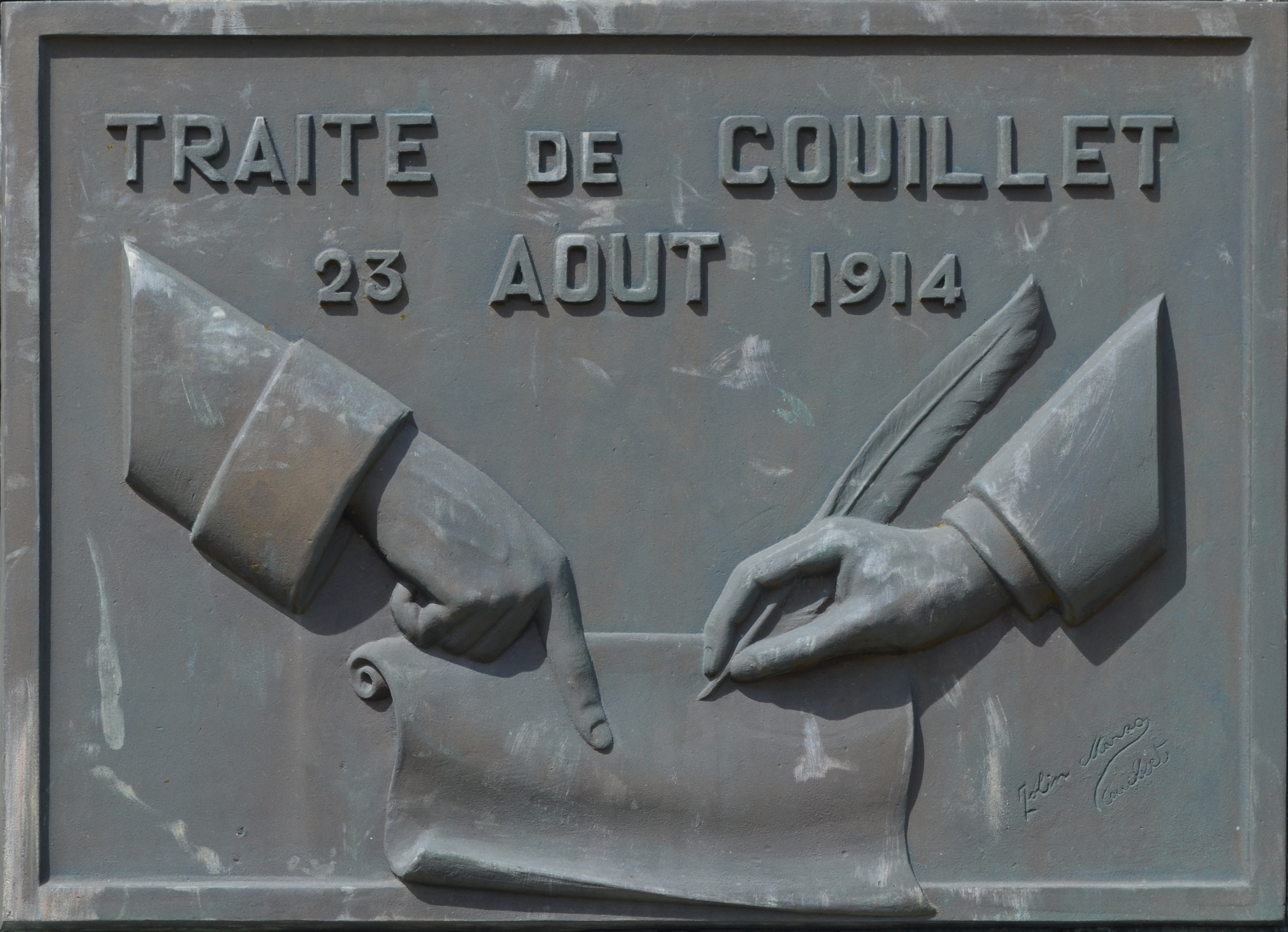
- Plaque commemorating the Treaty of Couillet signed on August 23rd, 1914.
- Context: World War I
- Signed: 23 August 1914
- Location: Couillet, Belgium
- Parties: Imperial German Army represented by Max von Bahrfeldt and the city of Charleroi represented by Émile Devreux.
- Language: German

The Couillet Treaty details the heavy war reparations imposed by the Imperial German Army on the Belgian town of Charleroi and its surrounding communes, in retaliation for the action allegedly carried out by francs-tireurs against its soldiers as they entered Charleroi.

On 22 August 1914, during the Battle of Charleroi at the start of World War I, German General Max von Bahrfeldt, commander of the 19th Reserve Division, set himself the objective of taking the bridges over the Sambre located at Charleroi and Couillet and held by soldiers of the French 3rd and 10th Corps. As they advanced through the town, the German soldiers were rarely fired upon by the French soldiers. Convinced of the presence of snipers, the Germans took civilians hostage and set fire to houses.

On 23 August, fearing that the town would be completely destroyed, a group of Carolorégian notables, including the burgomaster Émile Devreux, went to meet the general to negotiate. He accused the civilians of firing on his soldiers. Under threat of cannon fire, he forced the members of the delegation to sign the "Treaty of Couillet", which stipulated the payment of a hefty war indemnity in money and other assets, to be settled at 6 p.m. that same day.

The toll of German atrocities was 41 civilians killed and 159 homes burnt down in Charleroi itself. Around 250 civilians were killed and 1,300 buildings were destroyed throughout the Charleroi region.

== The Charleroi region at the beginning of the 20th century ==
After the depression of the last quarter of the 19th century, the twenty or so years leading up to World War I saw Belgian production rise at a rate of over 3% a year.

Given that coal was the main source of energy at the time, and that the region's subsoil contained different qualities of this fuel, Charleroi saw the emergence of a large number of industries linked to coal production. This growth was also linked to the technological skills of local and foreign entrepreneurs, the support of financial groups, and the exploitation of the working masses, who in 1914 had one of the lowest rates of unionization in Europe.

The Charleroi Exhibition of 1911 was the golden age of the Charleroi region. For the city, it was the year of its demographic peak, with 32,553 inhabitants, a record never reached again until the merger of the communes in 1977. The budget was balanced at just under 2,400,000 Belgian francs. (Note: The equivalent of approximately €2.6 million in 2013. Calculated according to Conraads and Nahoé, p. 151.)

== World War I and the invasion of Belgium ==
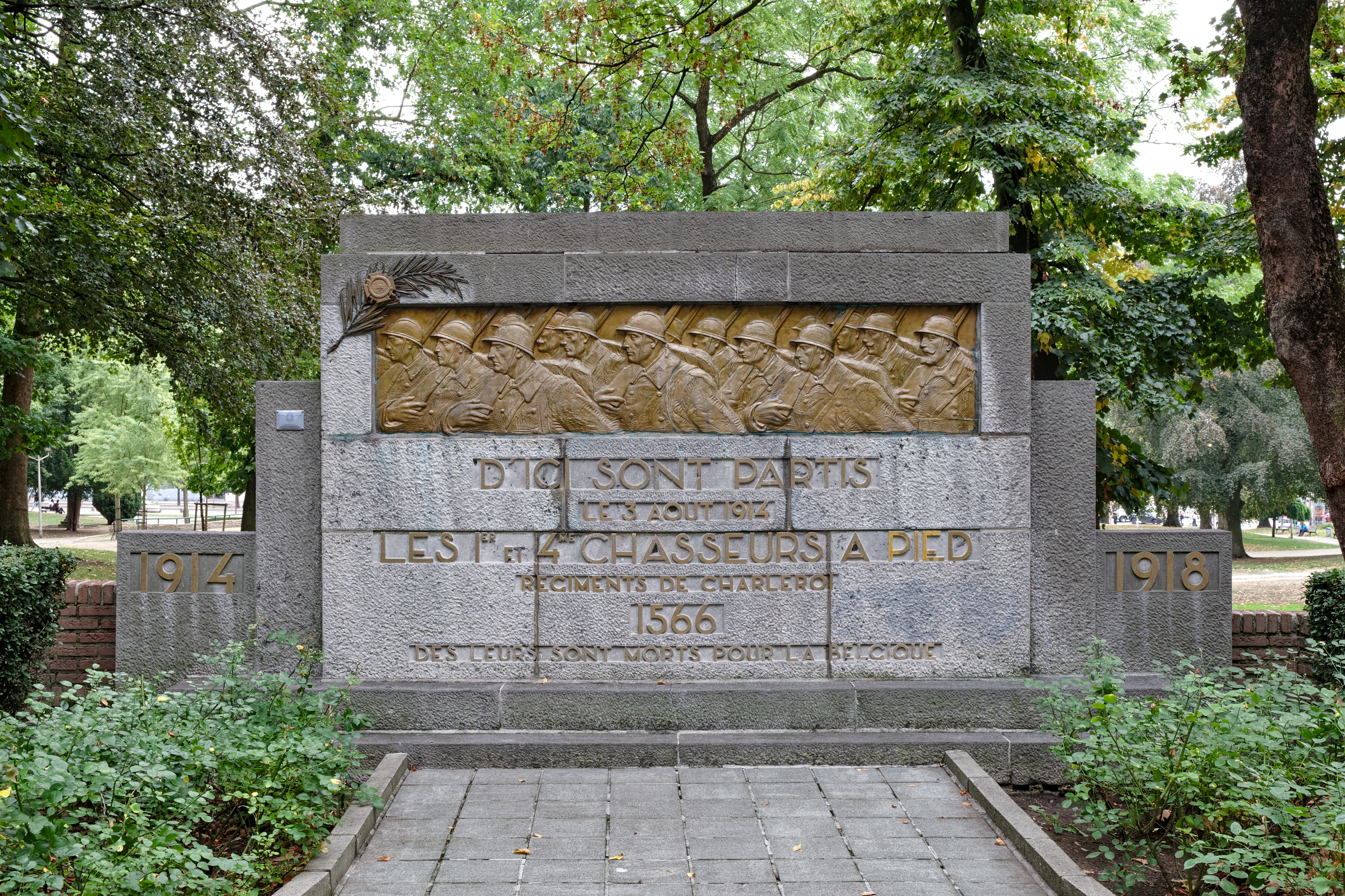
Monument dedicated to the 1st and 4th Regiments of Foot Chasseurs, in Charleroi's Parc Reine Astrid.

The tensions caused by the international situation in the spring of 1914, and the assassination of Archduke François-Ferdinand of Austria on 28 June and its aftermath, led King Albert I to decide on general mobilization on 31 July 1914. Germany demanded free passage for its troops through Belgian territory on 2 August and sent an ultimatum to the government.

On the following day, 3 August, this ultimatum was rejected. That same day, the 1st Regiment of Foot Chasseurs left Charleroi for Liège to the applause of the crowd. The brewery "Aux caves de Munich", in the rue du Comptoir, was ransacked by a few rioters.

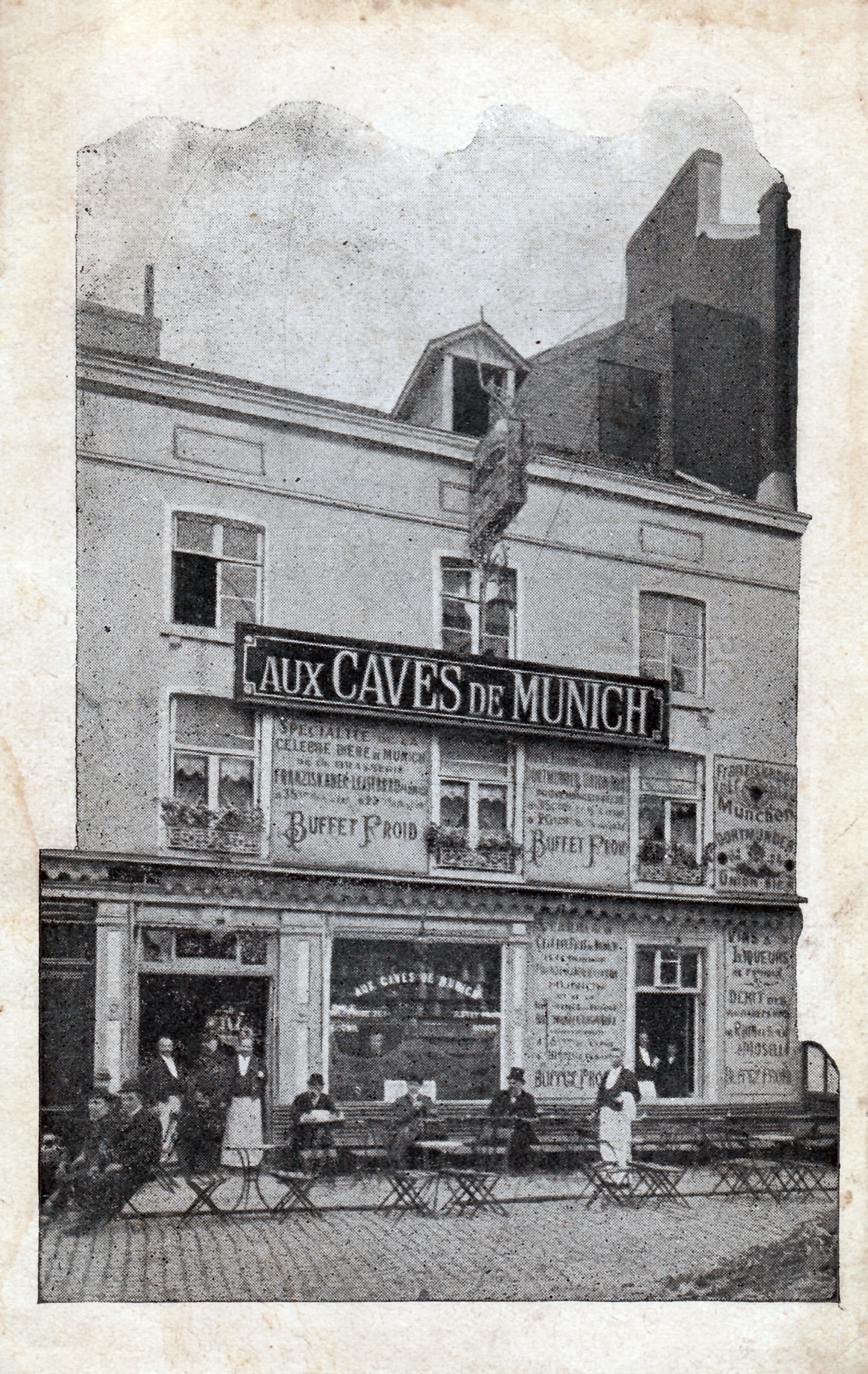
"Aux caves de Munich" brasserie.

The Germans entered Belgium near Aachen on 4 August. The King appealed to France and the United Kingdom. In Charleroi, the mob attacked the German consulate, taking down its flag and coat of arms. However, it escaped the fate suffered by the brewery the day before. The following day, the Garde Civique was mobilized.

On 16 August, the last fort in Liège surrendered. The press began to report German atrocities, including the massacre of civilians and the burning of houses. From then on, the authorities issued a series of calm orders to the population to prevent any acts that might provoke retaliation. In Charleroi, seven ambulances (Note: During World War I, an ambulance was a forward aid post as close to the front as possible, capable of receiving wounded soldiers for first aid before evacuating them to a military field hospital.) manned by volunteer doctors were ready for action. (Note: These included the civil hospital, the orphanage, the school for cripples, the athenaeum, the Jesuit college and the boys' and girls' schools at the Centre (Delaet, p. 58).) Over the next few days, several thousand people, mainly families of industrialists and shopkeepers, left Charleroi by train for other Belgian towns or France. On 20 August, the 3rd and 10th corps of the 5th French army commanded by General Lanrezac arrived in the town, where the population greeted them enthusiastically and awaited the British Expeditionary Force, which they knew was not far off.

However, the next morning, uhlans scouts from Generaloberst von Bülow's 2nd German army arrived in the town under the cover of a thick fog. They were initially mistaken for British but were eventually recognized by the French soldiers manning the barricade set up on the rue du Pont Neuf, who opened fire. Of the five Germans, two were wounded and a third killed. In the afternoon, we learned, to our dismay, that the Germans had entered Brussels the day before. Again that afternoon, the Belgian authorities ordered the civic guards to be sacked. (Note: As the front approached, several mayors decided to disband the Civic Guards so that the enemy would not see them as franc-tireurs (Sudden chaos, section 3a).) From then on, the French alone were responsible for guarding the bridges over the Sambre and defending the city.

On 21 August, the Battle of Charleroi began, centred on the capture of the bridges over the Sambre. From those at Tamines, Auvelais, and Arsimont, on the Lower Sambre, to those at Lobbes and Thuin, on the Upper Sambre. During the three days of fighting, civilians were indirect victims but were also targeted. Numerous massacres of civilians were perpetrated by the Imperial German Army. The Germans believed that there was collusion, including armed collusion, between the French army and Belgian civilians.

Since the Franco-Prussian War of 1870, officers of the Imperial German Army had been intensely concerned about how to deal with potential franc-tireurs. They were convinced that they would have to face them in a future conflict with France. This collective fear, combined with other factors such as alcohol, inexperience, physical and nervous exhaustion and the disorientation caused by fighting in an urban area, meant that they saw the city as a "nest of franc-tireurs", with snipers popping up everywhere.

There was also religious fanaticism. The Protestant German soldiers present felt that the Catholic priests were inciting their flocks to popular warfare. The fear of a workers' insurrection was much weaker. However, in 1906, a novel entitled 1906: Der Zusammenbruch der alten Welt (1906: The Fall of the Old World). It is said to have sold no fewer than 150,000 copies. It depicts a war between Germany and Great Britain, during which "a socialist insurrection by the workers of Charleroi responds to Germany's invasion of Belgium".

== 22 August 1914 ==
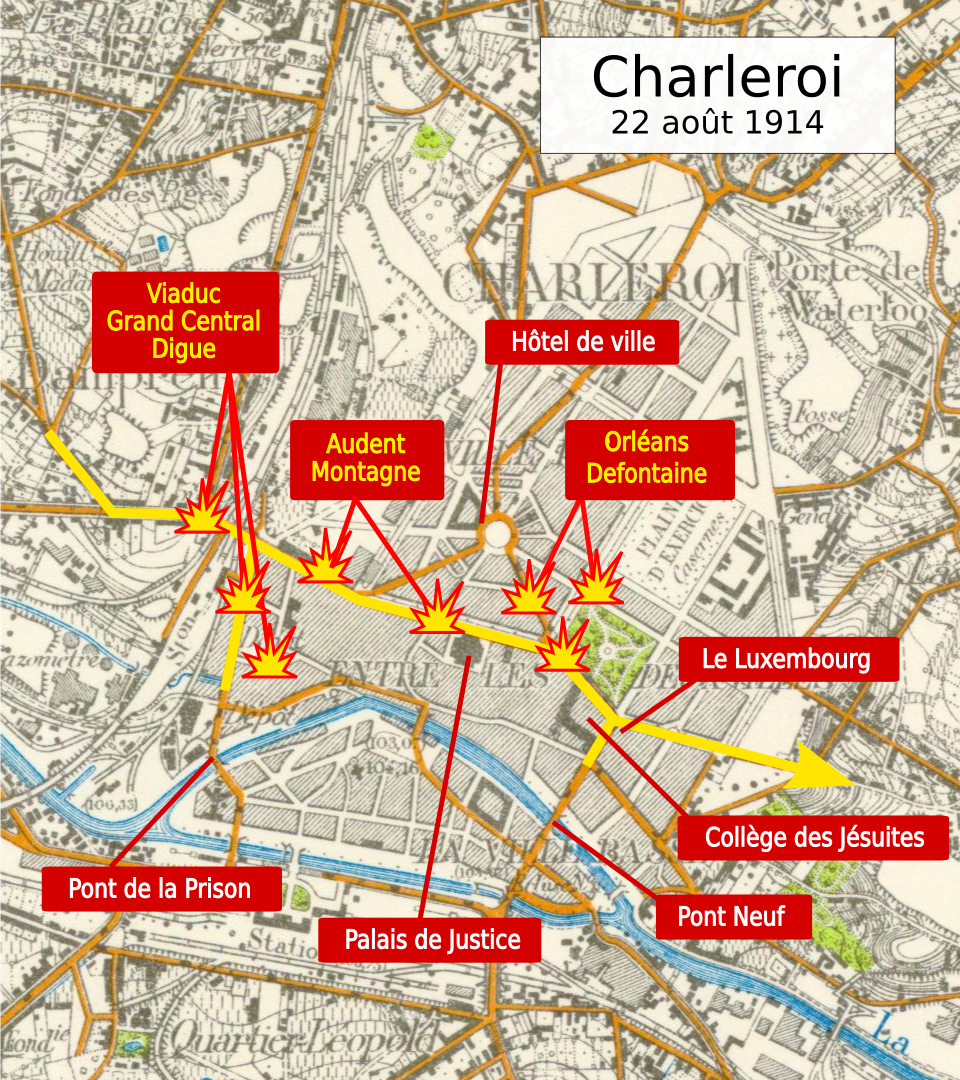
Topographical map of Charleroi at the start of World War I, showing the route taken by German soldiers and the main locations.

On 22 August, the 2nd German Army tried to take the bridges over the Sambre from the north and establish itself on the right bank. At around 6.30 am, troops from General Max von Bahrfeldt's 19th Reserve Division, a unit of the 2nd Army, came from Gosselies along the Chaussée de Bruxelles. Their targets were the Charleroi and Couillet bridges. Preceded by Belgian civilians taken hostage, they were fired upon by French soldiers entrenched at La Planche in Dampremy. After this altercation, the German soldiers turned back and marched up the road towards Bon-Air in Lodelinsart, where, claiming that civilians had been seen near the barricade, they looted and set fire to houses. From the heights of Jumet, German artillery bombarded the valley floor and Charleroi.

At Bon-Air, General von Bahrfeldt divided his troops into two columns. One headed towards Montignies-sur-Sambre and Couillet to take the Écluse bridge over the Sambre. The other (Note: The 78th Reserve Infantry Regiment (Horne and Kramer, p. 628).) was to capture from the rear the French troops entrenched at La Planche, who had evacuated the area in the interim. It headed towards Dampremy via the Warchat and the Deschassis slag heap and finally arrived, still preceded by civilians used as human shields, at a place called Viaducs by the rue de Heigne.

From here, the Germans headed towards the Prison Bridge via the Rue du Grand Central. From the bridge, the French, whose sole mission was to stop the incursions of German cavalry, fired, killing, and wounding soldiers and hostages. German soldiers cut holes in doors and windows to spray incendiary pellets inside houses. The whole of the Rue du Grand Central and the Digue Square went up in flames. Around twenty hostages were killed or injured.

Later that morning, the Germans, still accompanied by hostages, advanced along Boulevard Audent. Under the pretext of possible snipers, the soldiers methodically set fire to the bourgeois houses on the Boulevard Audent, but also in the Boulevard Defontaine and the rue d'Orléans. Only the Palais de Justice, the Protestant church, and a few houses around the Jesuit college, which served as an ambulance hospital, were spared. The Germans arrived in the rue du Pont Neuf at the crossroads with the Café du Luxembourg, from where they fired towards the barricade set up by the French in front of the bridge.

As the French had already evacuated the area, the German officers thought it would be difficult to take the Ville Basse and the bridges over the Sambre before the end of the day, so they turned east towards Montignies-sur-Sambre.

At nine o'clock in the evening, the houses on the boulevards, streets and squares along the east–west axis were still burning.

"Rue de la Montagne, Rue Charles II, Rue du Grand Central, Place de la Digue. All this forms one huge inferno where long flames are twisted into madness, where fantastic sprays of sparks shoot out in disproportionately high jets. In Rue Charles II, the house of a druggist was burning and looked like a huge green Bengal fire in this infernal firework display. Walls came tumbling down, burnt-out roof timbers collapsed. The whole earth is shaking and the heat is intolerable".

The town's inhabitants wondered about the Germans' intentions. Would they continue to set fire to the town and bomb it? Refugees from Couillet claimed that cannons were pointed at Charleroi. Léon Henvaux, secretary of the Chamber of Commerce, passed on this information to the mayor, Émile Devreux.

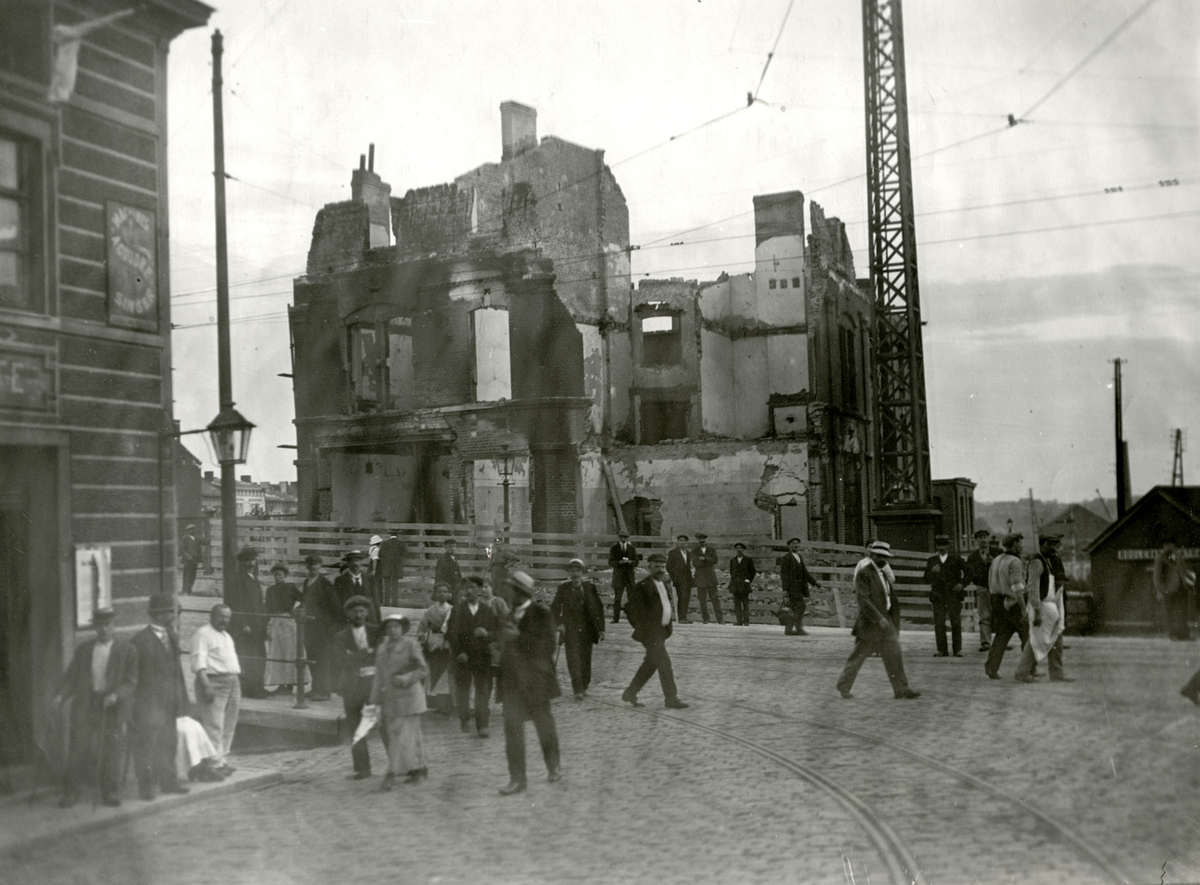
Entrance to the town, Viaduc Avenue.

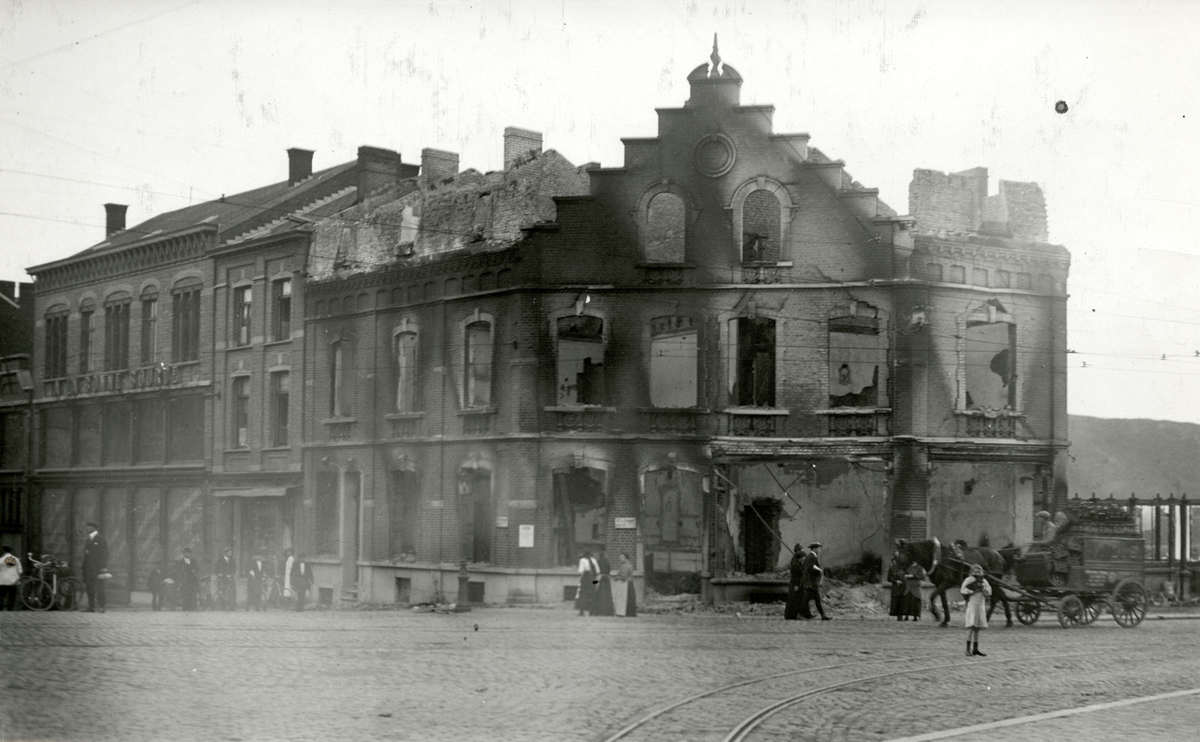
Corner of Rue du Grand Central and Viaduc Avenue.

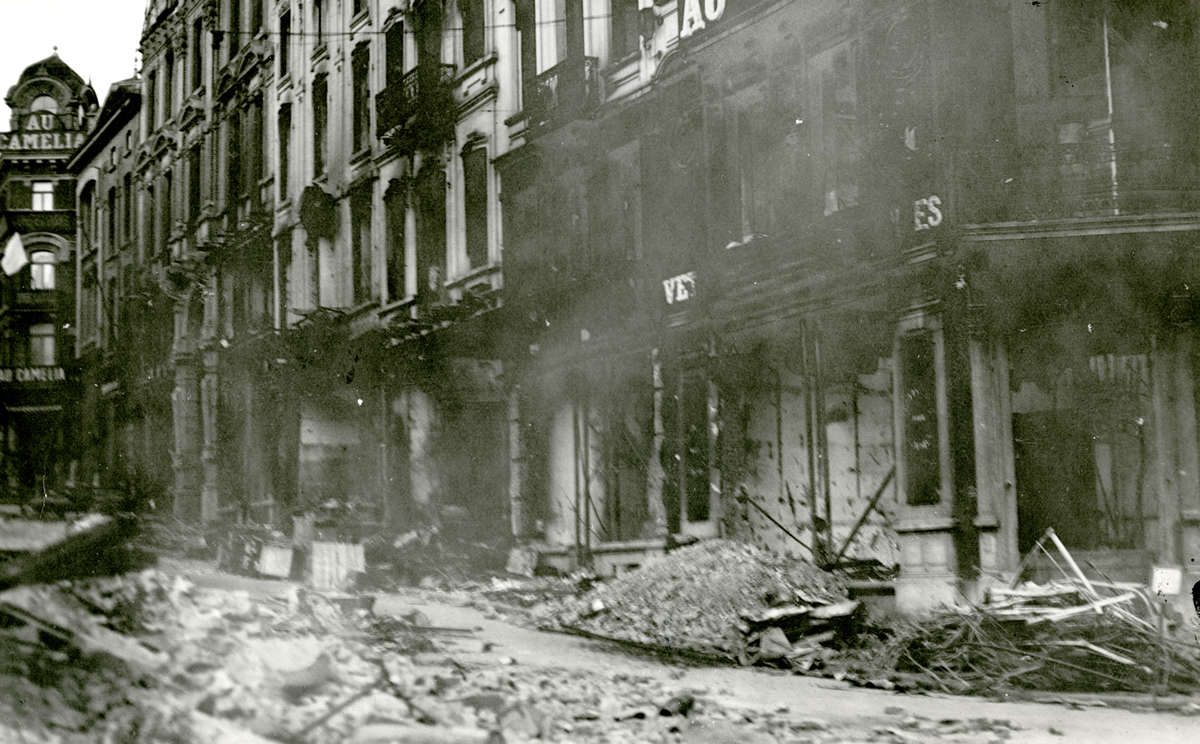
Corner of Rue de la Montagne and Audent Boulevard .

== 23 August 1914 ==
On Sunday 23 August, just after 5 am, a delegation set off in search of the German general, bearing a certificate of good conduct issued by the German consul before his departure. The group was made up of Émile Devreux, mayor, Émile Buisset, alderman for finance, Albert Dulait, a lawyer, whose car was driven by his son Paul, and Louis Smeysters, an exporter with a good command of German, who had agreed to act as interpreter. The latter was carrying a white flag.

The group headed for Montignies-sur-Sambre. In the square, the Caroloregians were accused of shooting at German soldiers. After displaying the document obtained from the German consul, the group, now accompanied by Lieutenant Hermann von Hanneken, was invited to head for Couillet, where they could meet General von Bahrfeldt at the Château de Parentville.

General von Bahrfeldt called on the mayor, pointing out that civilians had fired on his soldiers. He demanded payment of war indemnity. This was initially set at 50 million Belgian francs. Then, in the face of objections from the delegation, it was reduced to 10 million. (Note: The equivalent of just over eleven million euros in 2013 (Conraads and Nahoé, p. 151).) Émile Buisset then explained the city's financial situation. The General stuck to the ten million but allowed the sum to be paid in installments at intervals. The first fifth had to be paid before 6 o'clock in the evening. In addition to the ten million, the general imposed multiple requisitions for grain, flour, oats, and other foodstuffs. When Burgomaster Devreux pointed out to the General that these goods did not exist in Charleroi, the General replied that he had to make arrangements with the surrounding burgomasters and supply the goods before 6 o'clock in the evening, otherwise, Charleroi would be reduced to ashes. The delegation, with the exception of Louis Smeysters, who was being held hostage, took leave of the General and went to Charleroi town hall accompanied by Lieutenant von Hanneken.

In addition to Émile Devreux himself, Louis Lalieu, the dean priest of Charleroi, and Vital Françoisse, director of the ACEC, were held hostage in the mayor's office. The mayor appealed to the authorized representatives of the local banks: Banque de Charleroi, Banque Centrale de la Sambre, Union du Crédit, Banque Charles Bivort, Banque Félix Pierlot et Cie and Crédit Général Liégeois, who released all their available assets and guaranteed the additional cash contribution from wealthy individuals, including businessman Paul Dewandre. These efforts raised the sum of two million euros. Several bankers and the mayors of twenty communes also pledged to pay the ransom. (Note: This includes the communes of present-day Charleroi (except Goutroux), as well as Courcelles, Pironchamps, Farciennes, Châtelet, Châtelineau, and Acoz (Soudain le chaos, section 15).)

The foodstuffs demanded by the Germans, which were too large for the resources available in an industrial area, were incompletely collected by Alderman Édouard Falony with the help of the surrounding municipalities.

The delegation presented itself to the German headquarters at 6 pm that evening. The burgomaster nevertheless received a commendation for the loyalty with which he had carried out the requisitions imposed on him. The last hostages were freed and Charleroi thus escaped annihilation.

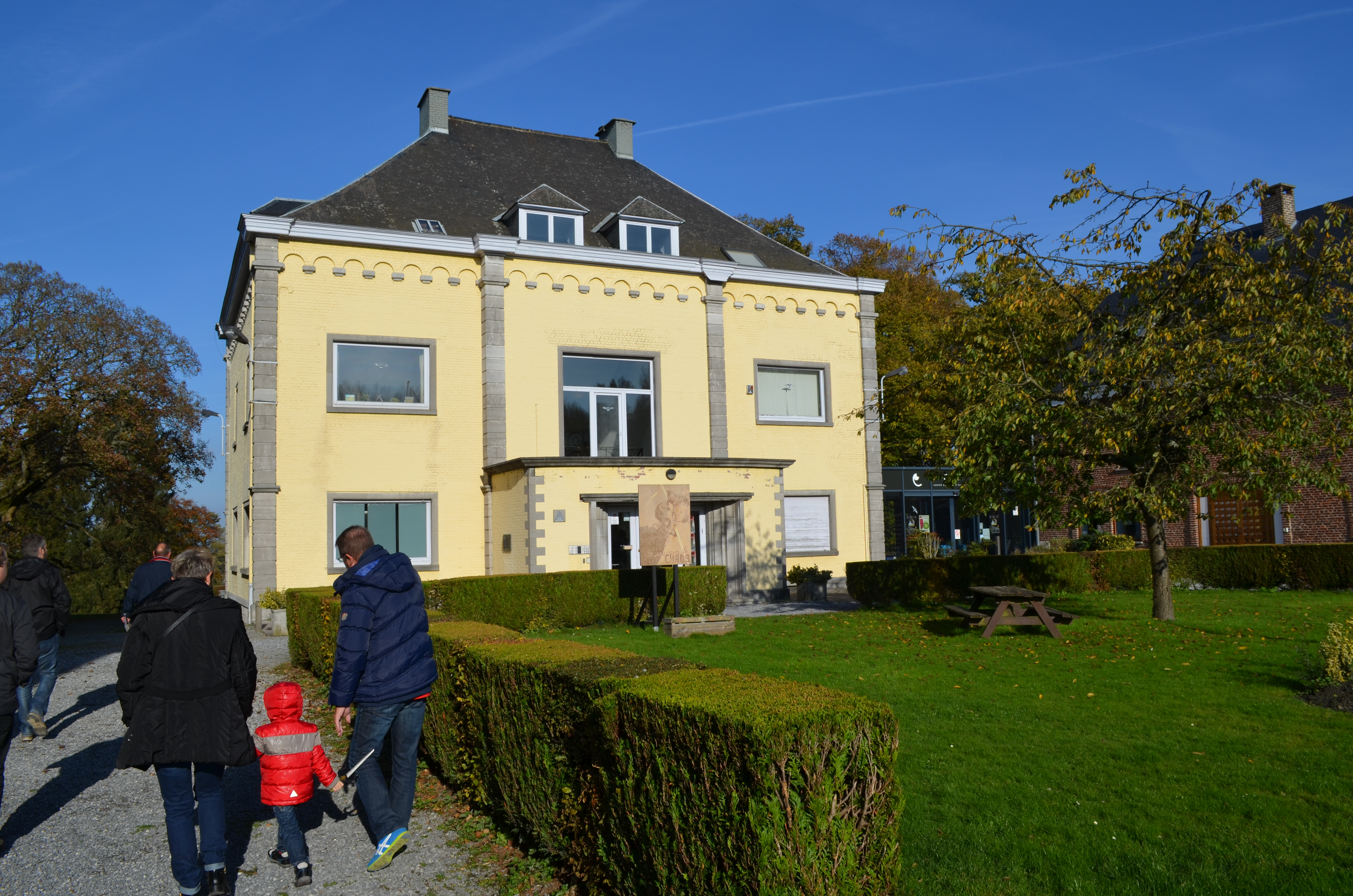
Château de Parentville in Couillet, where the treaty was signed.

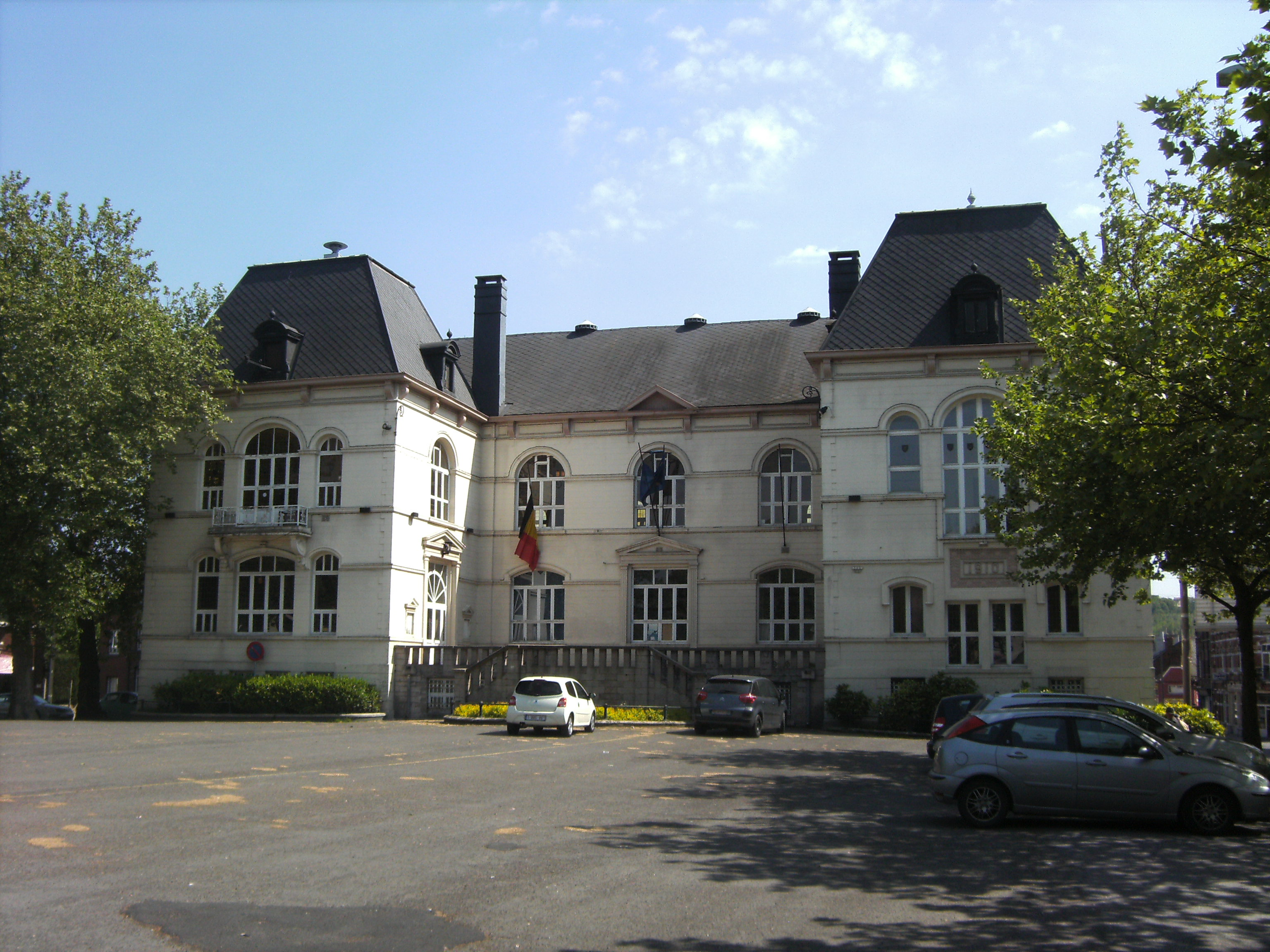
Montignies-sur-Sambre town square and town hall.

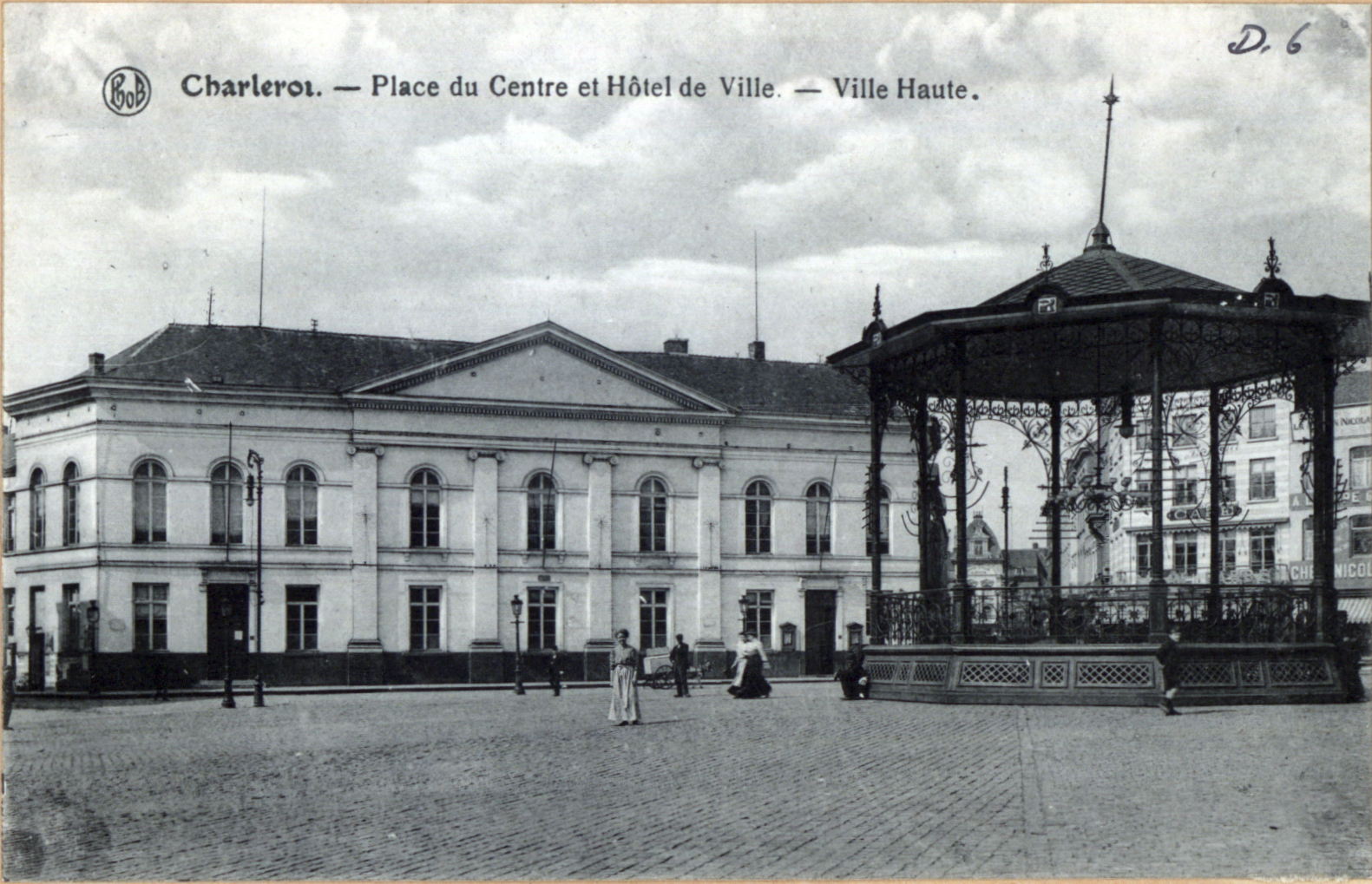
Charleroi Town Hall in 1914.

On a military level, August 23 saw the fall of the Namur forts in the east and the British surrender at Mons in the west. General Lanrezac had no one left to protect his flanks and decided to withdraw his army to the Givet-Philippeville-Merbes-le-Château line.

Around midnight, General von Bülow sent a telegram to the General Staff in which he summarised the progress made by the Second Army, stating that "the German soldiers had, in places, to defend themselves against acts of hostility from the civilian population".

Text from the Treaty (Note: A photo of the original German manuscript is published in Dulait, p. 194-195.)
Before the Commander of the 19th Reserve Division (Res. Div.) appeared the Mayor of the town of Charleroi, M. Devreux, hereby making the following requisitions:

The town of Charleroi, has to supply for this evening, 23rd August, 6 o'clock in the afternoon :

120 tons of oats, 40 tons of bread, 20 tons of canned and smoked meats, 800 kilos of coffee, 800 kilos of salt, 100 kilos of sugar, 3 tons of benzine and 50 litres of glycerine.

All these items are to be supplied in horse-drawn carriages and must be delivered by 6 p.m. to the Montignies-sur-Sambre town hall.

To be supplied:

Five automobiles; all weapons and ammunition in the possession of the inhabitants, revolvers, gunpowder, etc., also on the square of the Montignies Town Hall.

Finally, the town has to provide the sum of ten million francs in five installments, the first payment today August 23rd at 6 o'clock in the afternoon, will be two million in cash, securities, or bills of exchange. Subsequent payments of the same amount will be made at intervals of six to twenty days. Payment will be received at the Charleroi Town Hall until the full amount has been paid. The Mayor and two respectable citizens of the city will be kept as hostages.

Read and signed :

Von Bahrfeldt.

E. Deveux.

== Consequences and aftermath ==
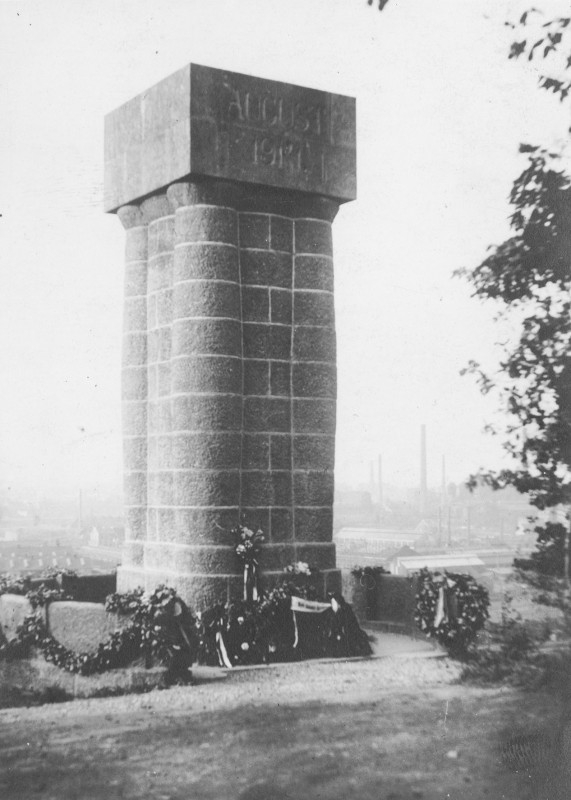
German monument "Den Kameraden" inaugurated on August 22, 1915 to commemorate the Battle of Charleroi in August 1914.

In Charleroi, 41 civilians were killed and 159 buildings destroyed. In Lodelinsart, 93 houses were burnt down and 16 civilians killed, in Dampremy 11 civilians were killed and 134 houses were burnt down, in Montignies-sur-Sambre 37 civilians were killed, in Jumet, 86 houses were destroyed and 10 civilians were killed, in Monceau-sur-Sambre, 251 houses destroyed and 37 civilians killed, as for Couillet, 69 houses were destroyed and 16 civilians killed. In all, 250 civilians were killed and 1,300 houses burned in the Charleroi region, not to mention the buildings looted and hundreds of hostages insulted and verbally abused.

The day after the treaty was signed, discussions ensued between the signatory communes about their respective shares. Finally, the mayors agreed to jointly and severally owe the banks and Paul Dewandre the sum of ten million francs, payable one year after the agreement, in proportion to the number of inhabitants. The balance of eight million still owed would not ultimately be claimed by Germany, but would be included in the war contribution imposed on Belgium.

For the population, it was the start of four years of occupation marked by deprivation and the death of loved ones.

In the German White Paper, (Note: Officially entitled Die völkerrechtswidrige Führing des belgischen Volkskriegs, which can be translated as Human Rights Violations in the Conduct of the Belgian People's War (Horne and Kramer, p. 355).) a work whose "intention is clearly to provide evidence in support of the accusations of a Belgian Volkskrieg", the battle in the heart of the town of Charleroi occupies very little space. A soldier belonging to the 78th reserve infantry regiment testified that he had seen a German Dragoon whose eyes had been gouged out by Belgian civilians, whose body was smeared with a flammable liquid, and burned alive. There is no mention of this anywhere else, however, not even in the accusations made by General von Bahrfeldt.

On 22 August 1915, in the presence of senior German military authorities, a monument was unveiled on the Couillet heights, bearing the words Den Kameraden ("To our comrades") and the date August 1914. This monument was blown up after the war, on 11 November 1920.

After the end of the war, Gen. Max von Bahrfeldt was convicted of war crimes at a trial in Belgium for his actions during the Battle of Charleroi and sentenced to death in absentia by a Belgian court martial in Mons in 1925. For his part, he denied any responsibility and felt in no way guilty for what had happened at Charleroi, blaming it on the "francs-tireurs":

"My division was to march to Charleroi, the seat of Belgian industry. Its suburbs resemble the industrial centres of Westphalia, but Charleroi is incomparably dirtier. The lowest layer of the working population is a mixture of Walloons, Flemings [sic], Germans and other foreign immigrants, all influenced by the low Catholic clergy, rotten from lack of any social care, fallen into alcohol and atrophied as a result, the Walloon easily irritable, devious, a dangerous enemy at the back of the army. [...]" According to Bahrfeld, when they arrived in the town, "the inhabitants opened fire on the innocent soldiers of the 19th reserve division from window wells, windows and roofs after being signalled by the ringing of bells. The houses from which the shots were fired fell into ruins and went up in flames. Civilians found with weapons in their hands were shot. No doubt many innocent people suffered the same fate, as the fierce street fighting whipped up passions. [Old, young and even women took part in the fighting. The women even dragged the wounded into their homes, where they robbed and tortured them".

== See also ==
- Sack of Dinant
- Battle of Charleroi
- German atrocities of 1914
- fr:Massacre de Dinant
- Massacre of Tamines
- Rape of Belgium
