= German atrocities of 1914 =

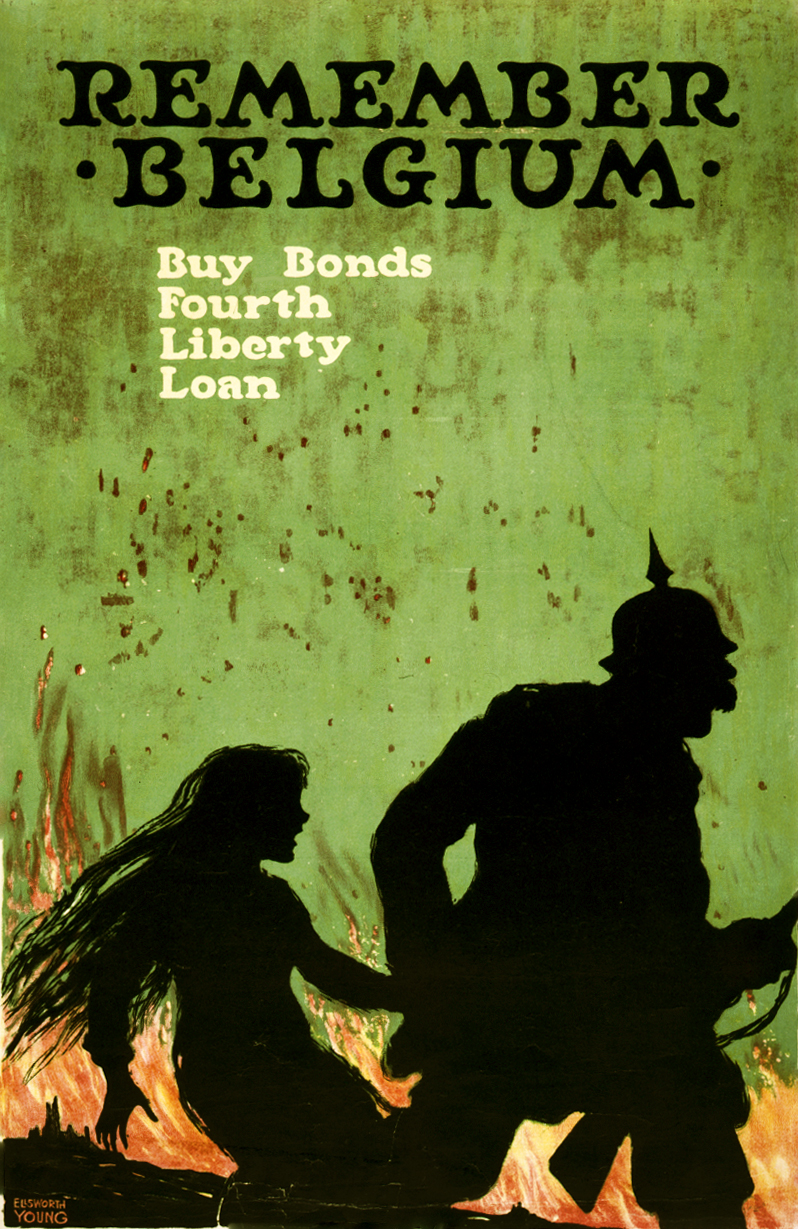
(By Ellsworth Young) An American poster depicting German atrocities in Belgium.

The German atrocities of 1914 were committed by the Imperial German Army at the beginning of World War I in Belgium, particularly in Wallonia, and in France in the departments of Meuse, Ardennes, and Meurthe-et-Moselle.

During three weeks in August and September 1914, these acts of violence claimed thousands of civilian casualties, in violation of the Hague Conventions of 1899 and 1907, among a population widely suspected of harboring Francs-tireurs.

Executions were carried out quickly and without fair trial, following decisions taken by German forces under the laws of war. Twenty thousand houses were also destroyed, including 600 in Visé and 1,100 in Dinant, Wallonia, the Belgian region on the main axis of the invasion that suffered most from these atrocities.

Even though the German people are traditionally stereotyped as orderly, well-disciplined, and invariably super-efficient, according to Thomas Weber, the real, "situational factors at play", during the August 1914 Rape of Belgium were, "the nervousness and anxiety of hastily mobilized, largely untrained civilians, panic, [and] the slippery slope from requisitioning to looting and pillaging."

These massacres, widely reported and exploited by the Allied press, placed Germany in a delicate international position and contributed to its discredit. International public opinion, especially in the United States, viewed Germany very negatively. This indignation was heightened when Germany declared an all-out submarine war and torpedoed Lusitania in 1915. These facts were exploited by pro-war movements in the United States and by American propaganda to encourage volunteers to enlist.

== Location ==
Most of the massacres took place in Wallonia and no province was spared since the German plan had placed it at the center of the invasion axis. In all the Walloon provinces, about a hundred villages were affected, in each of which at least ten civilians were shot. In Dinant, where several districts were burned to the ground, the number was as high as 674.

However, the events went beyond Wallonia and Belgium: in France, too, thousands died under the same conditions, especially in the Ardennes, the Meuse, and Meurthe-et-Moselle departments.

In the United Kingdom and the United States in particular, this "German barbarism" turned public opinion in favor of the war.

=== In Belgium ===
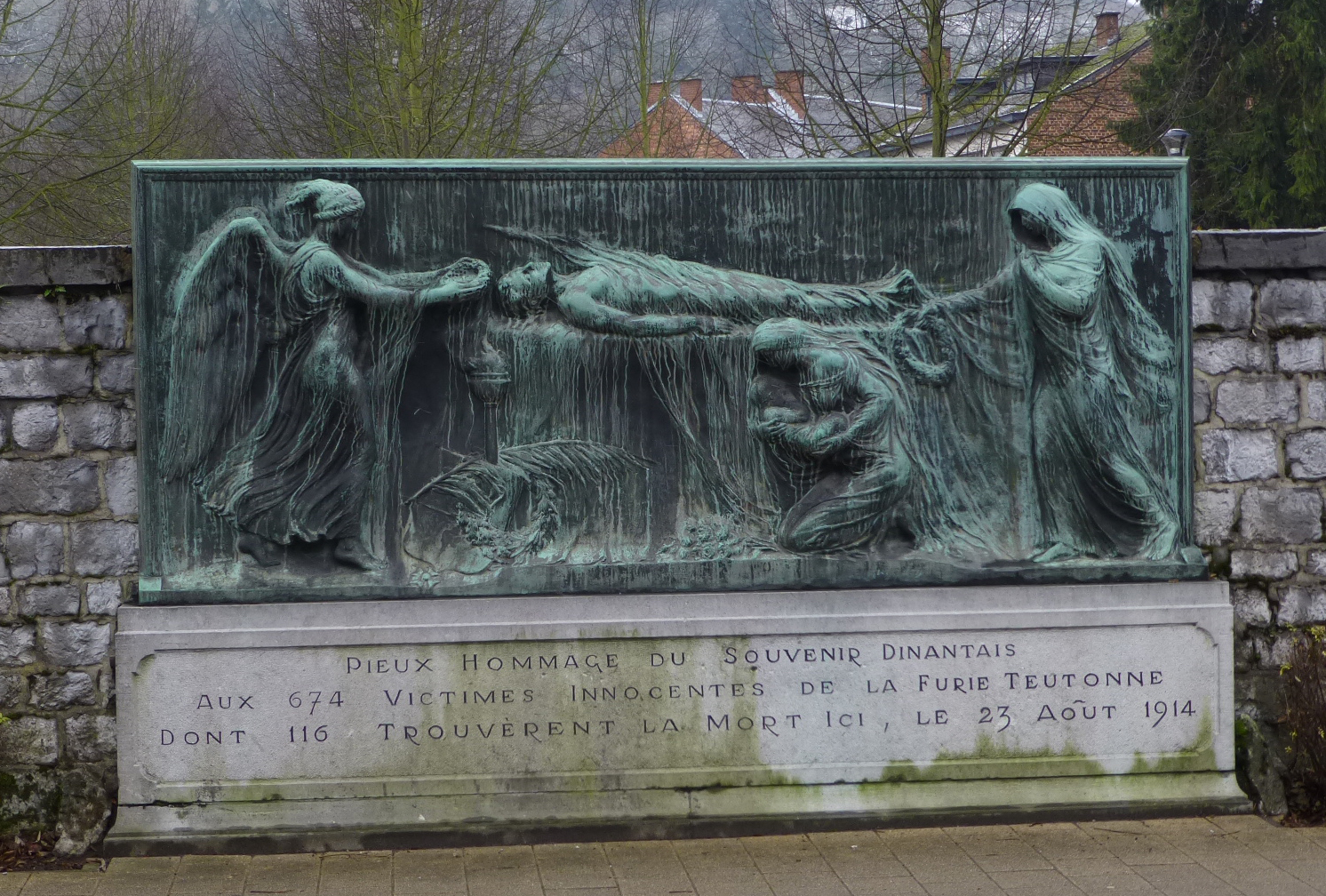
Monument to the 674 civilian casualties of Dinant's "Teutonic fury" on August 23, 1914, including 116 shot on this site.

From August 5 to 26, 1914, the Imperial German Army put more than 5,000 civilians under fire in a hundred Walloon villages and destroyed more than 15,000 houses, including 600 in Visé and 1,100 in Dinant, which represents 70% of the destruction carried out in France and Belgium at the beginning of the invasion.

The following list is not exhaustive, since it includes only those localities that suffered at least ten deaths:

- August 5: Berneau and Soumagne (118 civilian casualties).
- August 6: Battice (33 civilian casualties), Blegny, Esneux, Sprimont, Magnée, Moelingen, Olne, Hermée, Rétinne and Romsée.
- August 7: Warsage, Herstal, Lixhe and Louveigné.
- August 8: Baelen, Francorchamps, Herve and Labouxhe-Mélen (72 civilians shot from surrounding villages).
- August 9: Sint-Truiden.
- August 10: Linsmeau.
- August 14: Barchon.
- August 15: Wandre.
- August 16: Visé.
- August 18: Haccourt, Heure-le-Romain and Tongeren.
- August 19: Aerschot (156 civilians killed) and Attenrode.
- August 20: Liège, Érezée, Andenne (218 civilian casualties), Franc-Waret and Somme-Leuze.
- August 21: Arsimont and Auvelais.
- August 22: Anloy, Mussy-la-ville, Neufchâteau, Tintigny (120 civilian casualties), Tamines (383 civilian casualties), Bouffioulx, Farciennes, and the Charleroi region (250 civilian casualties).
- August 23: Ethe (218 civilian casualties), Bièvre (17 civilian casualties), Bouge, Dinant, Neffe and Bouvignes-sur-Meuse (674 civilian casualties in the sack of Dinant), Hastière-par-delà (19 civilian casualties), Spontin, Waulsort, Flénu, Jemappes, Nimy, Quaregnon, Ville-Pommerœul, Saint-Léger and Virton.
- August 24: Bertrix, Houdemont, Izel, Offagne, Hermeton-sur-Meuse, Namur and Latour (71 civilian casualties).
- August 25: Leuven (248 civilians killed), Anthée (13 civilian casualties), Romedenne, Surice, and Zemst (more than 10).
- August 26: Arlon, Dourbes (3 civilian casualties), and Frasnes-lez-Couvin (12 civilian casualties), the last Walloon locality to be hit.

=== In France ===
- August 1914: Haybes (2200 inhabitants).
- August 10: Jarny (3500 inhabitants, 25 shot).
- August 11: Bazailles (population 230).
- August 12: Badonviller (2,100 inhabitants, 84 houses burned, 12 civilians killed and 14 deported).
- August 20: Nomeny (1,300 inhabitants, 55 dead).
- August 23: Fresnois-la-Montagne (500 inhabitants, 102 houses burnt, 68 civilians killed).
- August 24: Gerbéviller.
- August 27: Crèvecoeur sur Escaut 13 civilians murdered.
- September 2, Senlis: In retaliation for the resistance of the French troops, who were retreating while continuing to fight, the mayor, Eugène Odent, was taken hostage along with several random civilians. He was abused and then shot. To justify their actions, the Germans claimed that civilians had joined the French army in firing on them, but this was never proven. Even if this had been the case, the Hague Convention in effect in 1914 was often disregarded. A total of 29 civilians were killed in and around Senlis during the nine days of occupation: either directly, because the Germans used civilians as human shields, as they had done on a large scale in Belgium, or indirectly, as a result of the bombing of the town and the fires set by German troops.
- September 6, Recquignies (Nord). At the beginning of the siege of Maubeuge, 13 hostages were shot on the banks of the Sambre near Boussois. They were French and Belgians living in Recquignies and Boussois. According to written testimony, they were shot by soldiers of the 57th infantry regiment from Barmen.

=== In Poland ===
- August 1914: Destruction of Kalisz

=== In North Sea ===
- 16 December 1914: Raid on Scarborough, Hartlepool and Whitby

== Explanations ==
The Encyclopédie de la grande guerre (1914-1918) (Encyclopedia of the Great War 1914–1918) deals with the question of the law of war in an article that refers to all the problems posed by civilians in the law of war and, among other things, the fact that the participation of non-belligerents "is an illegal act that can be freely punished by the power that detains them".

=== Francs-tireurs ===
Two Irish historians, John Horne and Alan Kramer, authors of German Atrocities (published in Dublin in 2001), and who have extensively consulted French, Belgian, and German archives, conclude that the German belief that francs-tireurs fired on German troops in the early days of the August 1914 attack is a "sincere misconception". The authors also try to understand the roots of this belief:

- In the real experience of the French franc-tireurs of the Franco-German war of 1870.
- In a certain conservatism on the part of the German leaders (political and military), suspicious of popular uprisings.
- In a confused feeling that the resistance of the Belgian army, which they had not expected, was illegitimate because it played into the hands of the French. This belief persisted in 1940 when 80 inhabitants of Vinkt in Flanders were shot, the Ardennes hunters had just defeated a German regiment.
- In the existence of a Civic Guard, inherited directly from the Belgian Revolution and considered by the Germans as francs-tireurs because it was organized in bourgeois paramilitary groups.
- In certain technical elements of the weapons of the time or certain peculiarities of the sites (as at Les Rivages).
- In the panic that led German troops to kill each other, facts that had to be covered up by the General Staff.

In Apologie pour l'histoire (The Historian's Craft), Marc Bloch writes: "Many Belgian houses have narrow openings in their facades, designed to facilitate the placement of scaffolding by masons; in these innocent mason's tricks, German soldiers in 1914 would never have dreamed of seeing so many loopholes, prepared for snipers, if their imagination had not long since been hallucinated by the fear of guerrilla warfare.

=== The French counter-offensive ===
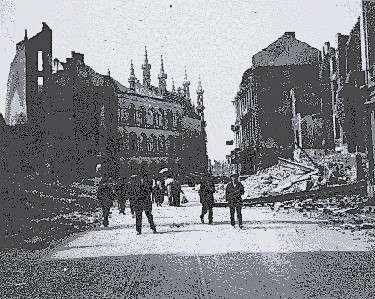
The destroyed city of Leuven in 1915.

These exactions may also have been because the Germans took it particularly badly when Belgium:

- Did not accept the terms of the German ultimatum (allowing German troops to pass through its territory to attack France).
- Allowed the French army to counterattack the German army on Belgian soil.

The Belgian position was based on the fact that Belgium's independence and neutrality were guaranteed by the signatories of the London Treaties (Treaty of the Eighteen Articles and Treaty of the XXIV Articles). According to this argument, Belgium was obliged to refuse the passage of the German army through its territory. On the other hand, according to the same argument, as soon as its neutrality and independence were violated, France and the United Kingdom could and should intervene.

The German position was based on the fact that, in their view, Belgium had to ally itself with France and the United Kingdom, thus betraying its neutrality, to prepare counter-offensive operations before the German attack.

The fact that many exactions took place immediately after the battles of the French counteroffensive (especially Dinant) supports this explanation.

Axel Tixhon, Professor of Contemporary History at the University of Namur, goes even further and proposes a third hypothesis:

"German troops knowingly organized these massacres, with orders to do so [...] Given the number of cases and the fact that they were committed by different German armies, we can assume that orders were given to terrorize the Belgian population. Testimonies and writings attest to these orders, particularly within the 3rd German Army, made up of Saxon troops, which crossed eastern Belgium, the Condroz and attacked Dinant".

The Schlieffen Plan and later the Blitzkrieg concept were based on a rapid attack on Belgium and France (Germany would take the initiative) and on the expected inertia of the United Kingdom. The resistance of the Belgian army and the rapid French and British responses were expected to thwart this plan.

These atrocities, which Germany thought would be quickly forgotten after a brief, victorious war, gave Germany a terrible image among neutral nations.

On May 10, 1918, Charles Spindler wrote in his diary:

I met Dr. L., who is now in the German propaganda department. He had just returned from Switzerland, where he had observed the superiority of French propaganda. "We lack competent journalists in Germany," he told me. "Our propaganda literature proves this. You can't read anything more stupid or clumsy. The result is that all neutrals are against us". I objected: "Are you sure that propaganda is the cause? In my opinion, the question is this: Were there acts of cruelty and violence in Belgium and France? - Of course there were, but they were inevitable. So, no matter how many talented journalists you hire, you won't be able to erase the crimes. The cause is wrong and cannot be defended."

== Posterity ==
=== Parallels with the German offensive in 1940 ===
The memory of the massacres of 1914 provoked an exodus of millions of Belgians and French to the south in May 1940. This exodus was one of the many explanations for the French defeat in the Battle of France, especially when they crossed the Meuse at Sedan on May 13 and 14, 1940. The roads clogged with fleeing soldiers sometimes hampered the progress of French divisions up the line, as in the case of the 3rd Reserve Armored Division during the armored counterattacks on Sedan.

== See also ==
=== Bibliography ===
- Berben, Paul; Iselin, Bernard (1967). Les panzers passent la Meuse (in French). Paris: Laffont.
- Horne, John; Kramer, Alan (2001). German atrocities, 1914: A History of Denial. Yale University Press. ISBN 978-0300089752.
- Horne, John; Kramer, Alan (2011). 1914, les atrocités allemandes : la vérité sur les crimes de guerre en France et en Belgique (in French). Translated by Benoît, Hervé. Paris: TALLANDIER. ISBN 978-2847348262.
- Bertrand, J. (1921). "Le martyre de la Province de Liège". La Belgique héroïque et martyre (in French). Borgerhout: Opdebeek.
- Lombard, Laurent (1938). Ludendorff à Liège (in French). Vox Patriæ.
- Spraul, Gunter (2016). Der Franktireurkrieg 1914 : Untersuchungen zum Verfall einer Wissenschaft und zum Umgang mit nationalen Mythen (in German). Berlin: Frank & Timme. ISBN 978-3732902422.
- Verleyen, Misjoe; De Meyer, Marc (2013). Augustus 1914 : België op de vlucht (in German). Manteau. ISBN 978-9022328194.
- Horne, John; Kramer, Alan (2005). Les Atrocités allemandes (in French). Tallandier. ISBN 2847342354.
- Nivet, Philippe (2011). La France occupée 1914-1918 (in French). Armand Colin. ISBN 978-2200289607.
- de Maricourt, André (1916). Le drame de Senlis : journal d'un témoin avant, pendant, après, août-décembre 1914 (in French). Paris: Bloud et Gay Éditeurs.

=== Related articles ===
- Massacre of Tamines
- Sack of Dinant
- Couillet Treaty
- Rape of Belgium

=== External links ===
- Senlis (in French)
