= Couillet =

Couillet may refer to:

- Couillet (locomotive builder)
- Couillet, Belgium
