= André Doms =

Belgian essayist, poet and writer (1932–2026)

- Born: 9 March 1932; Brussels, Belgium
- Died: 12 June 2026 (aged 94); Bouge, Belgium
- Occupations: Essayist; poet; writer

André Doms (9 March 1932 – 12 June 2026) was a Belgian essayist, poet and writer. He was known as editor-in-chief of the French-language magazine Journal des Poètes from 1976 to 1991.

In 1979, Doms was awarded the Léopold Rosy Prize for his essay Lecture de Jean Glineur by the Académie royale de langue et de littérature françaises de Belgique.

Doms died in Bouge on 12 June 2026, at the age of 94.
