= List of protected heritage sites in Sambreville =

This table shows an overview of the protected heritage sites in the Walloon town Sambreville. This list is part of Belgium's national heritage.

Object	Year/architect	Town/section	Address	Coordinates	Number^{?}	Image
Old tower, rue Saint Martin n ° 18 to Tamines ^{(nl)} ^{(fr)}		Sambreville		50.432598°N 4.614766°E	92137-CLT-0001-01 Info	Oude toren, rue Saint Martin n°18 te Tamines
The megalith and polisher on the Neolithic site at a place called "Les Tiennes de Jemeppe" and the Neolithic site at that place ^{(nl)} ^{(fr)}		Sambreville		50.480822°N 4.636532°E	92137-CLT-0002-01 Info	De megaliet en polijstmachine op de neolithische site op een plaats genaamd "Les Tiennes de Jemeppe" en de neolithische site op een plek genaamd "Les Tiennes de Jemeppe"
The house, on ruelle Evraux, the facades and roofs of the main building (with the exception of the outbuildings to the side and back) and the part of the wall between the park and ruelle Evraux of Lot n ° 345, and the ensemble of the building with park Auvelais ^{(nl)} ^{(fr)}		Sambreville		50.441281°N 4.635408°E	92137-CLT-0003-01 Info	
The facades and roofs of the windmill "Les Golettes" to Velaine, ensemble of the mill and the environment ^{(nl)} ^{(fr)}		Sambreville		50.463377°N 4.601501°E	92137-CLT-0004-01 Info	De gevels en daken van de windmolen "Les Golettes" te Velaine, ensemble van de molen en de omgeving
Cemetery des Fusillés and memorial Tamines ^{(nl)} ^{(fr)}		Sambreville		50.430980°N 4.614745°E	92137-CLT-0005-01 Info	

== See also ==
- List of protected heritage sites in Namur (province)
- Sambreville
