= 10th Reserve Division (German Empire) =

10th Reserve Division (10. Reserve-Division)
- Active: 1914–1919
- Country: Germany
- Branch: Army
- Type: Infantry
- Engagements: World War I: Great Retreat, Battle of Verdun, Battle of the Somme, Second Battle of the Aisne, Spring Offensive, Third Battle of the Aisne, Second Battle of the Marne, Aisne-Marne Offensive

Commanders
- Notable commanders: Max von Bahrfeldt

The 10th Reserve Division (10. Reserve-Division) was a unit of the Prussian Army, part of Imperial German Army in World War I. The division was formed on mobilization of the German Army in August 1914 as part of V Reserve Corps. The division was disbanded in 1919 during the demobilization of the German Army after World War I. The division was formed with a regular infantry brigade from the Province of West Prussia and a reserve infantry brigade from West Prussia and the Province of Posen.

== Combat chronicle ==
The 10th Reserve Division fought on the Western Front, participating in the opening German offensive which led to the Allied Great Retreat. Thereafter, the division remained in the line in the Verdun region until February 1916, when it entered the Battle of Verdun under command of General der Infanterie Max von Bahrfeldt. After a respite in the lines in the Upper Alsace and Champagne, the division fought in the later phases of the Battle of the Somme. It returned to Verdun in late October 1916. In 1917, it fought on the Aisne, including in the Second Battle of the Aisne, also known as the Third Battle of Champagne. The division returned again to Verdun in April 1917, remaining in the line until late July, when it went into reserve for a few weeks. It returned to the trenchlines near Reims on 8 August, remaining in that region until March 1918. The division then participated in the 1918 German spring offensive, including the Third Battle of the Aisne, and in the Second Battle of the Marne, the last major German offensive of the war. It fought against the French and American Aisne-Marne Offensive and remained in the line until the end of the war. Allied intelligence rated the division as first class and described it as a "big attack" division.

== Order of battle on mobilization ==
The order of battle of the 10th Reserve Division on mobilization was as follows:

- 77. Infanterie-Brigade
  - Füsilier-Regiment von Steinmetz (1. Westpreußisches) Nr. 37
  - 7. Westpreußisches Infanterie-Regiment Nr. 155
- 18. Reserve-Infanterie-Brigade
  - Reserve-Infanterie-Regiment Nr. 37
  - Reserve-Infanterie-Regiment Nr. 46
- Reserve-Ulanen-Regiment Nr. 6
- Reserve-Feldartillerie-Regiment Nr. 10
- 1.Reserve-Kompanie/Niederschlesisches Pionier-Bataillon Nr. 5
- 2.Reserve-Kompanie/Niederschlesisches Pionier-Bataillon Nr. 5

== Order of battle on 14 March 1918 ==
The 10th Reserve Division was triangularized in April 1916. Over the course of the war, other changes took place, including the formation of artillery and signals commands and a pioneer battalion. The order of battle on 14 March 1918 was as follows:

- 77. Infanterie-Brigade
  - Füsilier-Regiment von Steinmetz (1. Westpreußisches) Nr. 37
  - Reserve-Infanterie-Regiment Nr. 37
  - 7. Westpreußisches Infanterie-Regiment Nr. 155
  - Maschinengewehr-Scharfschützen-Abteilung Nr. 10
- 1. Eskadron/Reserve-Dragoner-Regiment Nr. 3
- Artillerie-Kommandeur 61
  - Reserve-Feldartillerie-Regiment Nr. 10
  - I.Bataillon/Reserve-Fußartillerie-Regiment Nr. 3
- Pionier-Bataillon Nr. 310
- Divisions-Nachrichten-Kommandeur 410
