= Max von Bahrfeldt =

Max Ferdinand von Bahrfeldt
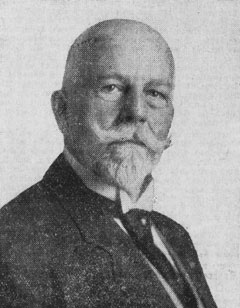
- Born: 6 February 1856; Willmine, Kingdom of Prussia
- Died: 11 April 1936 (aged 80); Halle an der Saale, Nazi Germany
- Relatives: Emil Bahrfeldt
- Military career
- Allegiance: German Empire
- Branch: Imperial German Army
- Service years: 1873–1916
- Rank: General der Infanterie
- Unit: 75th Infantry Regiment
- Commands: 37th Infantry Division; 19th Reserve Division; 10th Reserve Division
- Conflicts: World War I: Battle of Charleroi (1914); Battle of St. Quentin (1914); First Battle of the Marne; First Battle of Champagne; Battle of Verdun
- Awards: Order of the Red Eagle; Order of the Crown

Max Ferdinand Bahrfeldt (German pronunciation: [ˈmaks ˈfɛʁdinant ˈbaːɐ̯fɛlt]), ennobled as von Bahrfeldt [fɔn ˈbaːɐ̯fɛlt] in 1913 (6 February 1856 – 11 April 1936), was a royal Prussian General of the Infantry, a local historian, and a numismatist of world renown. In the anglophone and francophone world, however, he was also notorious as the alleged perpetrator of atrocities in Charleroi, Belgium, during the German invasion of 1914.

== Early life ==
Bahrfeldt was born into a family from Prenzlau in the Uckermark. Joining the Corps of Cadets in 1869 he was made a Lieutenant in the 75th Infantry Regiment "Bremen" in 1873, stationed at Stade. Bahrfeldt had been interested in numismatics from his youth. He specialized in the coinage of the Roman Republic and the coins of Lower Saxony. Bahrfeldt commenced his numismatic researches while he was in the Army and he published his first numismatic essay in 1874. One year later he became co-editor of the Numismatisch-Sphragistischer Anzeiger. Zeitung für Münz-, Siegel-, und Wappenkunde (published in Hannover). 3 years later he was assigned to the post of Regimental Adjutant. During this period he served as secretary for the local historical society and curated its coin collection. He also carried out excavations at the Perleberg site of the beaker people.

On 14 October 1878 Bahrfeldt married in Gotha Elisabeth (Ella) Mary Charlotte Samwer (8 October 1859, Gotha – 19 October 1954, Frankfurt/Main), the daughter of the jurist, professor of constitutional law and author Karl Friedrich Samwer (1819–1882), who was also a numismatist. In 1883 Bahrfeldt published in Vienna from Samwer's papers the History of the Older Roman Coinage from about 200 B.C. He followed this up with further publications about the coinage issued in the region between the Elbe and the Weser. In 1879 Bahrfeldt published, based on the previous work of Wilhelm Heinrich Jobelmann and Wilhelm Wittpenning, a revised History of the City of Stade. From 1882 to 1885 he studied at the Prussian Staff College. In 1911, Bahrfeldt was granted an honorary doctorate by the philosophical faculty of the University of Giessen and from 1921 onwards was honorary professor for numismatics at the University of Halle-Wittenberg. He was awarded the medal of the Royal Numismatic Society in 1912.

== Late military career ==
Bahrfeldt was promoted to Oberst in 1904, and to Generalmajor in 1908. He commanded the 37th Infantry Division from 1911 till 1913. Being promoted to Generalleutnant on 16 June 1913, Bahrfeldt was ennobled as a member of the Prussian hereditary nobility (as part of the twenty-fifth anniversary of the reign of Kaiser Wilhelm II) and was awarded the Order of the Red Eagle 2nd class with oakleaves and the Order of the Crown 2nd class.

In August 1914, at the start of First World War, Bahrfeldt was given command of the 19th Reserve Division, part of the X. Reserve Corps and the 2nd Army. He captured Charleroi on August 22, 1914, and imposed on them the Couillet Treaty. Accused by the Allies of atrocities at Charleroi, in 1925 he was condemned to death in absentia by a Belgian court. His division participated in the Battle of St. Quentin and the following Battle of the Marne. He fought in the First Battle of Champagne and in June 1915 he was given command of the 10th Reserve Division and promoted to General der Infanterie. He led his division into the Battle of Verdun and was phased out of the Army in April 1916.

== Later life ==
Bahrfeldt joined the Deutsche Vaterlandspartei upon its formation in 1917. In the Weimar Republic, he was a member of the Monarchist Deutschnationale Volkspartei and it's paramilitary Wing, Der Stahlhelm. After the forced dissolution of the Stahlhelm after the creation of the Third Reich, Bahrfeldt transferred to the reserve of the SA. Max von Bahrfeldt died on 11 April 1936 in Halle.

Bahrfeldt is acknowledged as one of the greatest, possibly the greatest, student of coinage of the Roman Republic.

== Literature ==
- Gothaisches Genealogisches Taschenbuch der Adeligen Häuser, Part B 1941, page 18, Justus Perthes, Gotha 1941.
- Wilhelm Jesse (1953). "Bahrfeldt, Max von". Neue Deutsche Biographie (in German). Vol. 1. Berlin: Duncker & Humblot. p. 543.
- Jürgen Bohmbach: Stader Stadtlexikon. Stade: Stader Stadtsparkasse 1994
