= Massacre of Tamines =

Massacre in First World War

- Part of the Rape of Belgium
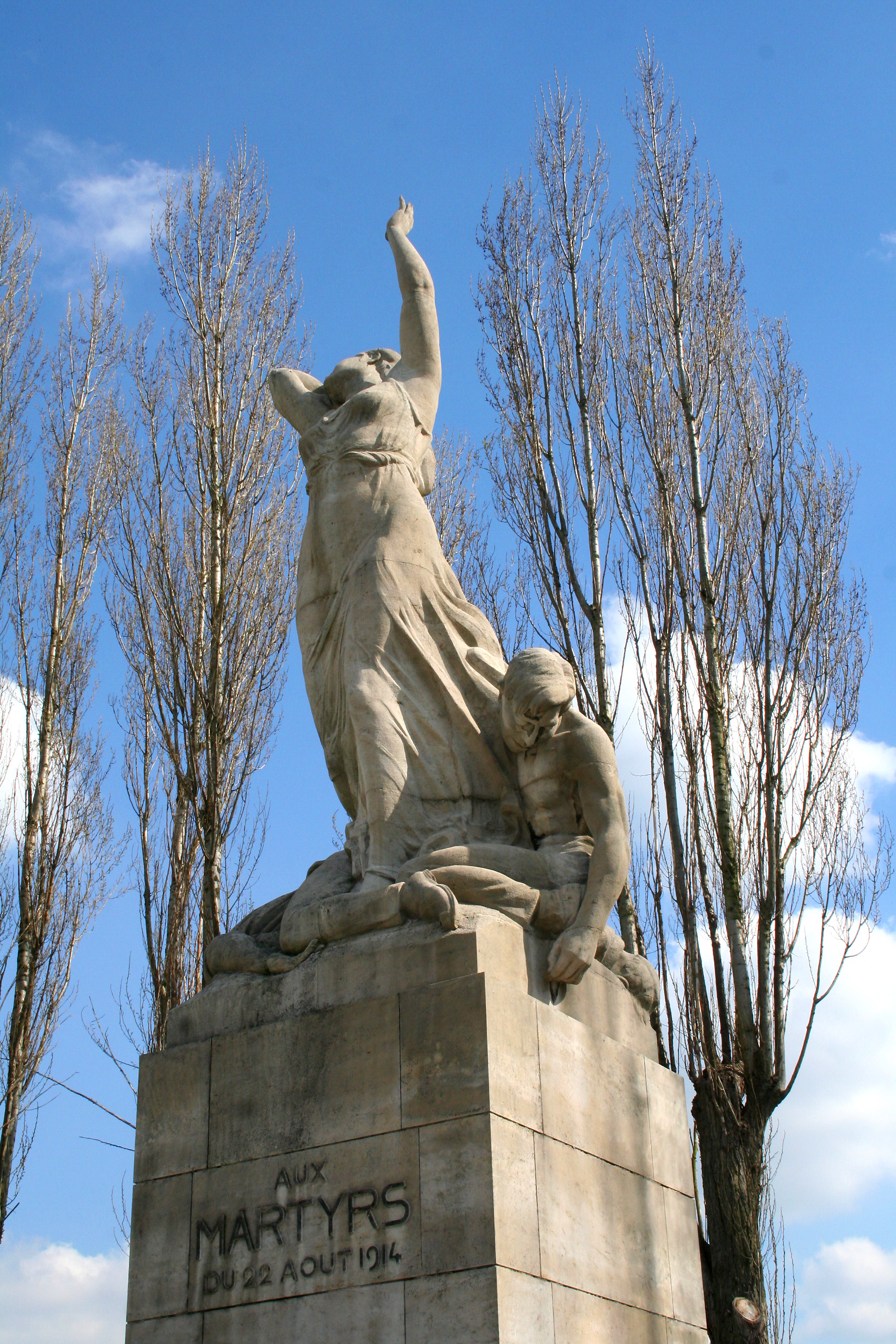
- Memorial to the Massacred
- Location: Tamines, Namur, Belgium
- Date: 21 August 1914
- Target: Belgian civilians
- Attack type: War crime, massacre
- Deaths: 384
- Perpetrator: Imperial German Army

The massacre of Tamines were the summary executions and mass murder perpetrated by the German army against Belgian civilians in the town of Tamines in Namur, Belgium in the early period of the First World War.

== Prelude ==
On the morning of August 4, 1914, German cavalry entered Belgian territory. Acting in ordinance with the Schlieffen Plan, written out in 1905, two German armies crossed Belgium to attack France from the north. Belgium declared war on Germany for the first time in its history, which caused German armies to rush Belgium on August 3 on the city of Liège, which they seized. On August 8, the city officially fell into German hands. The Belgian army, however, put up more resistance than the German strategists had expected. The resistance of the forts, numerous around Liège, slowed down the German advance, their capture resulting in the death of approximately 5,000 German soldiers. Liège, however, still fell. This city was the only important barrier on the road to the invasion. This allowed the first German army to move towards Brussels. In contrast General Von Bülow, at the head of the second army, continued its route towards Basse-Sambre, in the direction of Namur and Charleroi. General von Bülow arrived on August 12 at Huy. Upon arrival, the Belgian brigade withdrew to Andenne. On 20 August, on the orders of General von Bülow, a German column shot more than two hundred civilians in Andenne. The second German army continued up through the Meuse valley, reaching the Sambre at Namur. They arrived near Tamines, between Namur and Charleroi, on August 20. There, they faced multiple French soldiers.

== Events ==
On Friday 21 August 1914, around 6 AM, a patrol made up of five German uhlans came down the Ligny road from Sambreville. They had barely reached the town hall when around thirty French soldiers and a few artillerymen from the Civic Guard of Charleroi opened fire and wounded one of the horsemen. The other four went to find reinforcements from Sambreville. The wounded soldier was taken prisoner by the Civic Guard and treated by Doctor Scohy.

An hour later, about thirty more uhlans accompanied by cyclists arrived at the entrance to the village by the Ligny road. Again, the French soldiers returned fire. While this occurred, however, entire detachments of Germans had taken over the Praile district, which was located near the entrance of the village. The tension became high as soldiers threatened to shoot prisoners. Around 8 a.m., an officer ordered five prisoners to go in front of the soldiers to serve as a shield. While this happened, the soldiers fired sporadically at houses and in the street. On the way back, while the wounded were being transported by nearby civilians, the French soldiers targeted the Germans who immediately retaliated. German soldiers then killed an eight-year-old girl and a man. They also set fire to and ransacked multiple houses in the Praile district.

Later that day, a very long firing squad with five layers of superimposed guns arrived. The first rank of soldiers were tightly crouched. A German officer suddenly left the ranks and advanced towards the civilians. He accused them of having fired on the soldiers. He said that as a result, they would be shot.

Around 8:00PM, a whistle sounded, signaling the first shooting. The platoon fired on a compact mass formed by men. As soon as the whistle sounded, the men went to the ground. The Germans then shouted to the men to get up immediately, but nobody moved. A group of soldiers then advanced towards the men lying on the ground. The men, frightened, got up quickly. As they stood up, a second shooting began. The soldiers, according to witnesses, used a machine gun. Many people were killed. The soldiers fired irregularly at the men that were still standing.
