= Sambreville =

City in Namur Province, Wallonia, Belgium

Sambreville: Sambveye (Walloon)
- Municipality
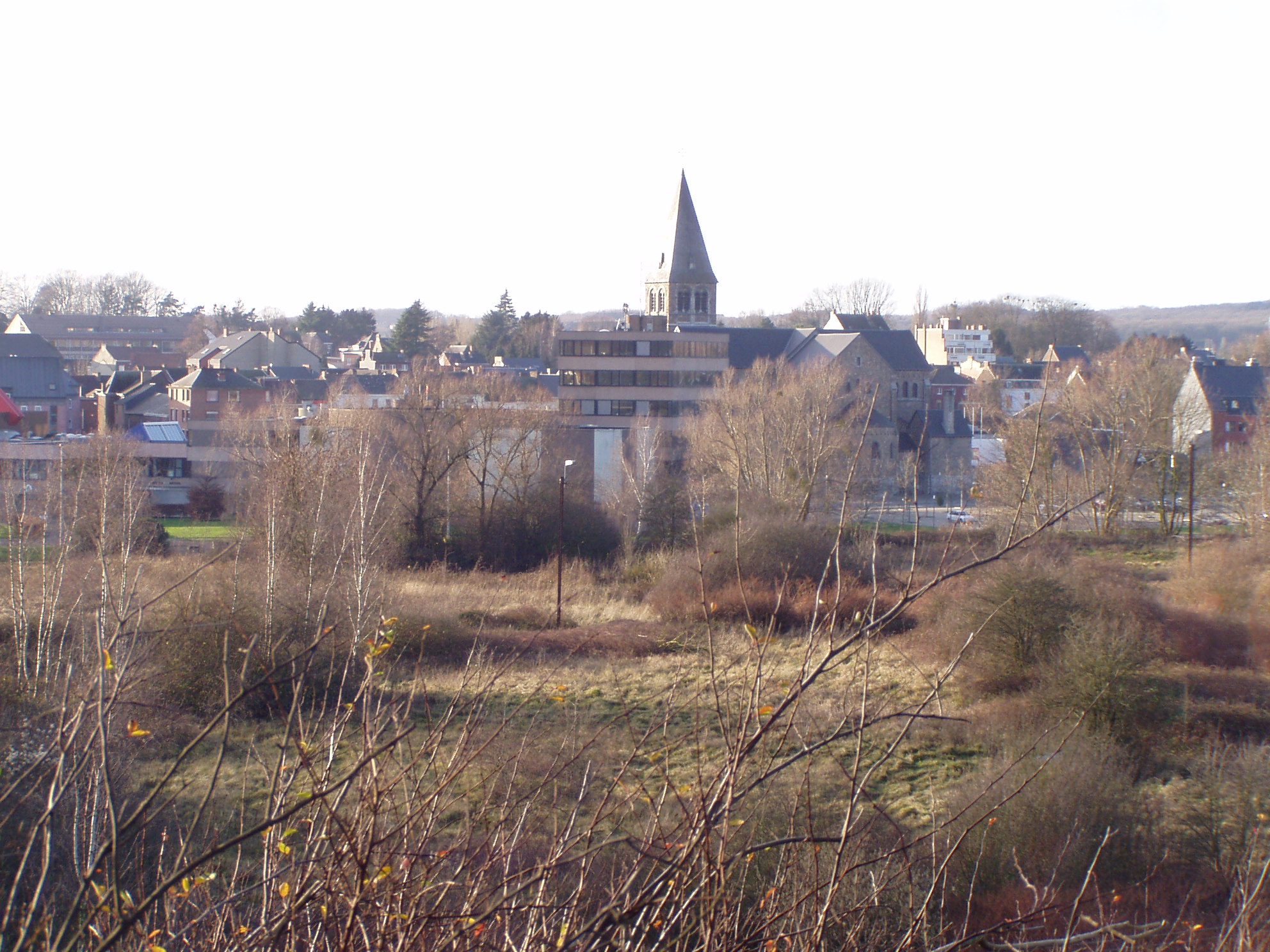
- Auvelais

- Flag Coat of arms

- Location of Sambreville in Namur Province
- Interactive map of Sambreville
- Location in Belgium
- Coordinates: 50°27′N 04°36′E
- Country: Belgium
- Community: French Community
- Region: Wallonia
- Province: Namur
- Arrondissement: Namur

Government
  - Mayor: Olivier Bordon
  - Governing party: Ensemble

Area
  - Total: 34.27 km^{2} (13.23 sq mi)

Population (2018-01-01)
  - Total: 28,211
  - Density: 823.2/km^{2} (2,132/sq mi)
- Postal codes: 5060
- NIS code: 92137
- Area codes: 071
- Website: www.sambreville.be

Sambreville (French pronunciation: [sɑ̃bʁəvil]; Walloon: Sambveye) is a municipality and since March 12, 2024 a Belgian city of Wallonia located in the province of Namur, Belgium.

On January 1, 2006, Sambreville had a total population of 26,949. The total area is 34.20 km^{2} (13.20 sq mi) which gives a population density of 788 inhabitants per square kilometre (2,040/sq mi).

== Villages and towns ==
The municipality was created in 1977, as part of the post-1974 fusion of the Belgian municipalities, bringing together the ancienne communes (now towns and villages) of:

- Arsimont
- Auvelais
- Falisolle
- Keumiée
- Moignelée
- Tamines
- Velaine

Tamines is associated with the Rape of Belgium during World War I. At least 384 townspeople were massacred, including women and children.

== Twin towns ==
- Gessopalena, Italy

== See also ==
- List of protected heritage sites in Sambreville
