= Civilian casualty =

Civilians killed, injured, or imprisoned by non-civilians

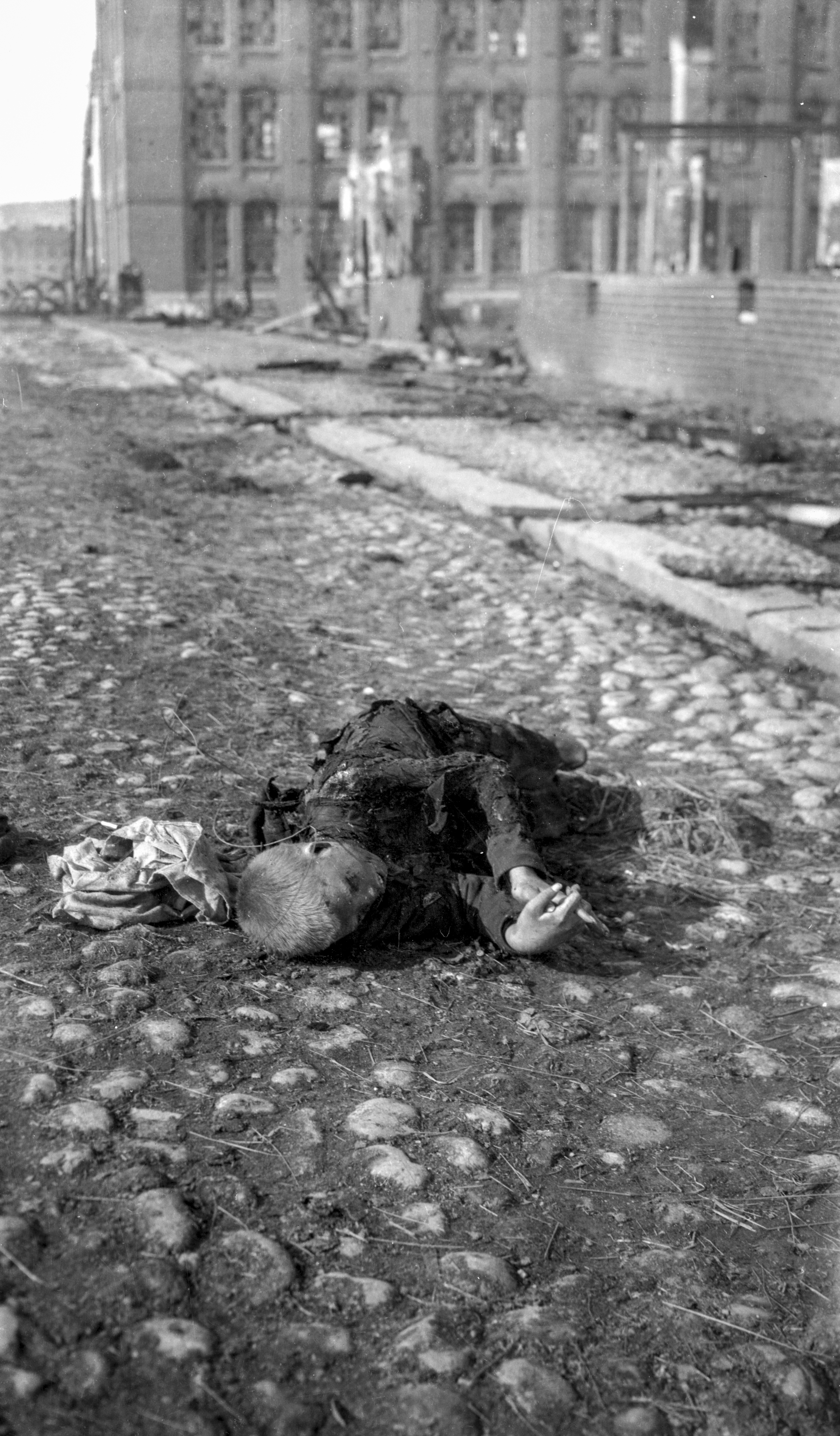
The body of a young boy on the street in Tampere after the 1918 Finnish Civil War.

A civilian casualty occurs when a civilian is killed or injured by non-civilians, mostly law enforcement officers, military personnel, rebel group forces, or terrorists. Under the law of war, it refers to civilians who perish or suffer wounds as a result of wartime acts. The term is generally applied to situations in which violence is committed in pursuit of political or military goals. Intentionally directing attacks against civilians can constitute a war crime under international humanitarian law. During periods of armed conflict, there are structures, actors, and processes at a number of levels that affect the likelihood of violence against civilians.

The term is also sometimes used in non-military situations; for example, during police operations against criminals such as bank robbers, hostage-takers or mass shooters, deaths/injuries by members of the public who are neither police nor the criminals may be referred to as civilian casualties.

== Overview ==
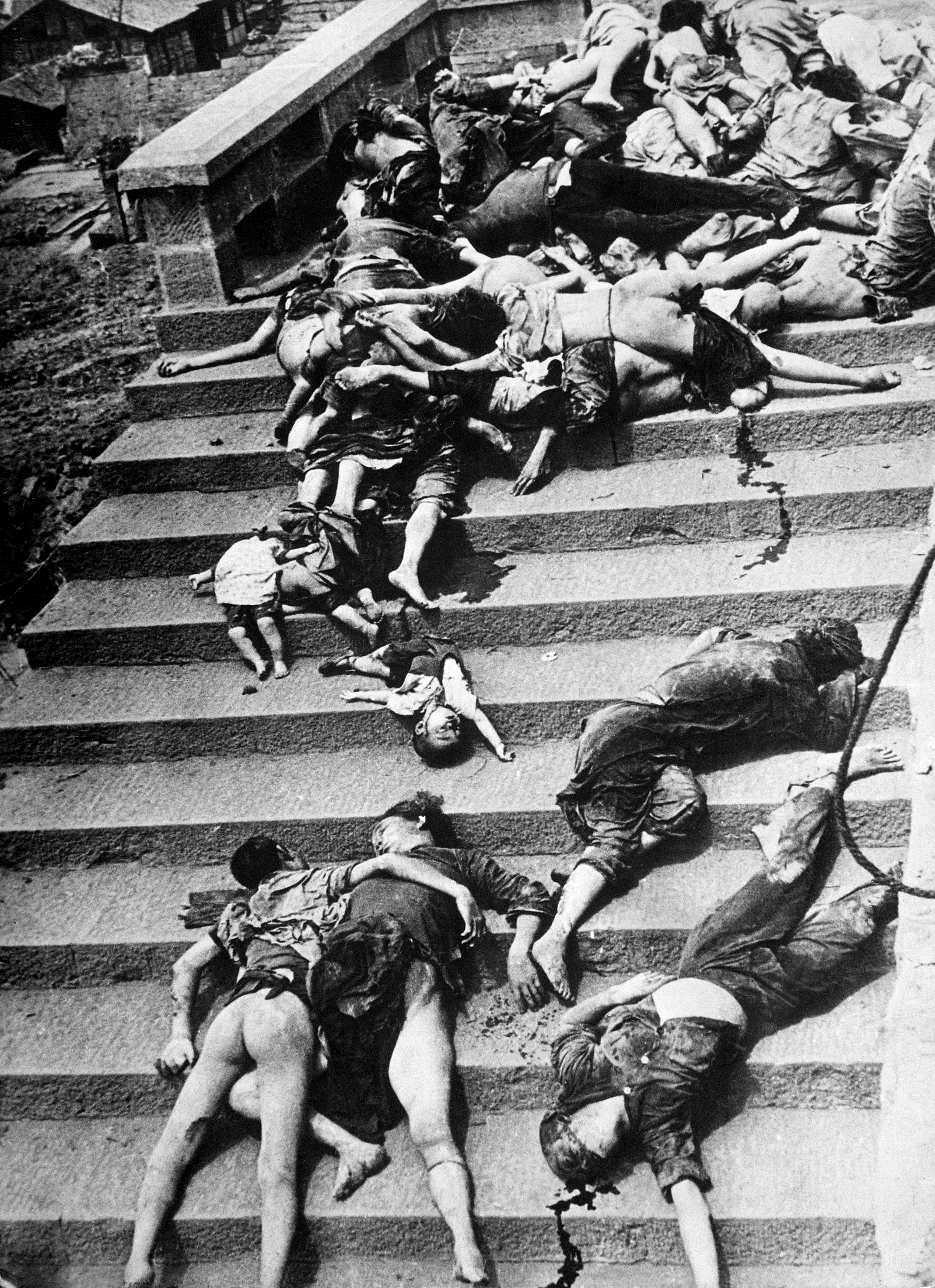
Casualties of a mass panic during a June 1941 Japanese bombing of Chongqing. More than 5,000 civilians died during the first two days of air raids in 1939.

In times of armed conflict, despite numerous advancements in technology, the European Union's European Security Strategy, adopted by the European Council in Brussels in December 2003, stated that since 1990, almost 4 million people have died in wars, 90% of them civilians. However, United Nations Children's Fund (UNICEF) reports that civilian fatalities have climbed from 5% at the turn of the century to more than 90% in the wars of the 1990s.

Generating reliable assessments of casualties of war is a notoriously complex process. Civilian casualties present particular difficulties. One problem is that the attribution of the label 'civilian' is contested in some cases. On the surface, the definition of a civilian, at least in the context of international armed conflicts, is relatively simple: a civilian is any person who is not a member of the armed forces and is not a combatant in situation of armed conflict. To make effective use of such statistics as there are about civilian casualties of war, it is necessary to be explicit about the criteria for inclusion. All too often, there is a lack of clarity about which of the following categories of civilian casualties are included in any given set of figures.

1. Those killed as a direct effect of war;
2. Those injured as a direct effect of war;
3. Those dying, whether during or after a war, from indirect effects of war such as disease, malnutrition and lawlessness, and who would not have been expected to die at such rates from such causes in the absence of the war;
4. Victims of one-sided violence, such as when states slaughter their own citizens in connection with a war;
5. Victims of rape and other forms of sexual violence in connection with a war;
6. Those uprooted in a war – that is, refugees and Internally Displaced Persons (IDPs);
7. Those who, even after a war is over, die prematurely from injuries sustained in war.

The inclusion of people in each of these categories may be defensible, but needs to be explicit. Each category presents its own methodological problems. In the case of people dying from indirect effects (category 3), much careful work is needed to distinguish between 'expected' and 'excess' levels of mortality. In the case of victims of sexual crimes (category 5) there could be an argument for including not only direct crimes by combatants, but also 'indirect' crimes due to general social collapse. In the case of those uprooted in war (category 6), the implication that refugees and IDPs always count as war victims is too simple. Some may be fleeing one-sided violence from a repressive state apparatus, natural calamity, or general social breakdown. Moreover, in certain episodes, such as the Indo-Pakistani War of 1971, the Kosovo War of 1999, and the Afghanistan War of 2001, military campaigns have enabled large numbers of refugees to return home. Indeed, in the 1971 and 1999 wars, refugee return was a stated reason for launching hostilities. Yet this key observation finds remarkably little reflection in the literature about the casualties of contemporary war. A focus on the numbers of those uprooted in war is especially problematic as those who are trapped in conflict zones may in fact be worse off than those uprooted, but seldom feature in statistics. Figures for war deaths and for war-related migration should be presented separately, not amalgamated.

== International humanitarian law ==
Following World War II, a series of treaties governing the laws of war were adopted starting in 1949. These Geneva Conventions would come into force, in no small part, because of a general reaction against the practices of the Second World War. Although the Fourth Geneva Convention attempted to erect some legal defenses for civilians in international armed conflicts, the bulk of the Fourth Convention devoted to explicating civilian rights in the hands of the enemy, and no explicit attention is paid to the problems of bombardment and the hazardous effects in the combat-zone.

In 1977, Protocol I to the Geneva Conventions was adopted as an amendment to the Geneva Conventions, prohibiting the deliberate or indiscriminate attack of civilians and civilian objects in international armed conflicts; the attacking force must take precautions and steps to spare the lives of civilians and civilian objects as possible. Although ratified by 173 countries, the only countries that are currently not signatories to Protocol I are the United States, Israel, Iran, Pakistan, India, and Turkey.

Under international humanitarian law applicable to international armed conflict, enemy civilians and stateless persons or neutral nationals outside the territory of a belligerent state are protected persons under Article 4 of the Fourth Geneva Convention and the 1907 Fifth and 13th Hague Conventions regarding the duties of neutrals on land and naval warfare. Only neutral nationals in the territory of a belligerent state (e.g., the taking of U.S. residents in Iraq hostage by Iraqi authorities during the Gulf War before January 17, 1991) and citizens of an allied state (such as rapes committed by French colonial troops against allied Italian civilians after the Battle of Monte Cassino during World War II) are not protected persons under the laws of war.

The Rome Statute of the international Criminal Court defines "intentionally directing attacks against the civilian population" in both international and non-international conflicts as illegal, but it only came into effect on 1 July 2002 and has not been ratified by every country.

=== Refugees ===
The laws of war have changed over the course of history, and international protocols like the Fourth Geneva Convention explicitly provide legal protections to protected civilians in territories belonging to or occupied by a belligerent party during and after an international armed conflict. The 1951 Refugee Convention and the 1967 Protocol Relating to the Status of Refugees has also given protection to people who have a well founded fear of persecution.

Some researchers have included refugees and internally displaced persons in their definition of "civilian casualty".

== Ethics ==
Harm to noncombatants during armed conflict raises a number of moral questions. A central issue is whether, and why, civilians should have greater protection from harm than combatants.

One framework for considering these questions is just war theory, which addresses civilian harm through principles including distinction and proportionality. Distinction concerns who may be targeted, while proportionality weighs expected harm to civilians against the value of an attack.

Some philosophers have argued that moral constraints on warfare cannot be determined solely by weighing harms against benefits. In his 1972 essay “War and Massacre”, Thomas Nagel contrasts utilitarian reasoning with an absolutist view that some actions are wrong regardless of their consequences.

Pacifism offers a broader perspective on civilian casualties by questioning the moral justification of war or violence. It encompasses a range of positions, from absolute pacifism, which holds that war and violence are always morally wrong, to more limited or conditional forms. Some pacifist arguments also question whether it is morally justified to kill enemy combatants, particularly conscripts who may whose participation may not have been voluntary.

== Civilian casualty ratio ==
The civilian casualty ratio compares civilian and combatant losses in armed conflict. Depending on the methodology, figures may represent the ratio of the two or the proportion of total deaths that are civilian.

== Collateral damage ==
In armed conflict, collateral damage refers to unintended harm to civilians or civilian property resulting from attacks on military targets.

== See also ==
- Civilian
- Non-combatant
- War
- Casualty recording
- Casualty (person)
- Civilian victimization
- Concentration camps
- List of concentration and internment camps
- Nazi concentration camps
- Wartime sexual violence
