= 19th Reserve Division =

19th Reserve Division (19. Reserve-Division)
- Active: 1914-1919
- Country: Germany
- Branch: Army
- Type: Infantry
- Size: Approx. 15,000
- Engagements: World War I: Great Retreat, First Battle of the Marne, Battle of Verdun, Battle of the Somme, Second Battle of the Aisne, Passchendaele, Oise-Aisne Offensive

Commanders
- Notable commanders: Max von Bahrfeldt

The 19th Reserve Division (19. Reserve-Division) was a unit of the Imperial German Army in World War I. The division was formed on mobilization of the German Army in August 1914 as part of X Reserve Corps. The division was disbanded in 1919 during the demobilization of the German Army after World War I. The division was raised in the Prussian Province of Hanover, the Grand Duchy of Oldenburg, and the Duchy of Brunswick.

== Combat chronicle ==
The 19th Reserve Division began the war under command of Generalleutnant Max von Bahrfeldt on the Western Front, participating in the opening German offensive which led to the Allied Great Retreat and ended with the First Battle of the Marne. Thereafter, the division remained in the line on the Aisne and in the Champagne. From May 1915 to March 1916, the division fought in Upper Alsace. It then fought in the Battle of Verdun until July, when it went into the Argonne Forest. In October 1916, it saw action in the later phases of the Battle of the Somme. In April 1917, the division fought in the Second Battle of the Aisne, also known as the Third Battle of Champagne. In May, it was sent to the Eastern Front, and fought around Riga until September. It then returned to the Western Front, where it saw action in the Battle of Passchendaele. It was back in the trenchlines at Verdun from October 1917 to April 1918. In August–September 1918, the division faced the French and American Oise-Aisne Offensive. It remained in the line until war's end. Allied intelligence rated the division as first class.

== Order of battle on mobilization ==
The order of battle of the 19th Reserve Division on mobilization was as follows:

- 37. Reserve-Infanterie-Brigade
  - Reserve-Infanterie-Regiment Nr. 73
  - Reserve-Infanterie-Regiment Nr. 78
- 39. Reserve-Infanterie-Brigade
  - Reserve-Infanterie-Regiment Nr. 74
  - Reserve-Infanterie-Regiment Nr. 92
  - III. (Großherzoglich Oldenburgisches) Bataillon/Reserve-Infanterie-Regiment Nr. 79
- Großherzoglich Oldenburgisches Reserve-Dragoner-Regiment Nr. 6
- Reserve-Feldartillerie-Regiment Nr. 19
- 1.Reserve-Kompanie/Hannoversches Pionier-Bataillon Nr.10
- 2.Reserve-Kompanie/Hannoversches Pionier-Bataillon Nr.10

== Order of battle on March 8, 1918 ==
The 19th Reserve Division was triangularized in September 1916, sending the 37th Reserve Infantry Brigade headquarters and the 74th Reserve Infantry Regiment to the newly formed 213th Infantry Division. Over the course of the war, other changes took place, including the formation of artillery and signals commands and a pioneer battalion. The order of battle on March 8, 1918, was as follows:

- 39. Reserve-Infanterie-Brigade
  - Reserve-Infanterie-Regiment Nr. 73
  - Reserve-Infanterie-Regiment Nr. 78
  - Reserve-Infanterie-Regiment Nr. 92
- 3.Eskadron/Reserve-Dragoner-Regiment Nr. 6
- Artillerie-Kommandeur 114
  - Reserve-Feldartillerie-Regiment Nr. 19
  - II.Bataillon/Fußartillerie-Regiment Nr. 3
- Pionier-Bataillon Nr. 319
- Divisions-Nachrichten-Kommandeur 419
