= Auvelais =

Section of Sambreville, Belgium

Coordinates: 50°27′N 4°37′E

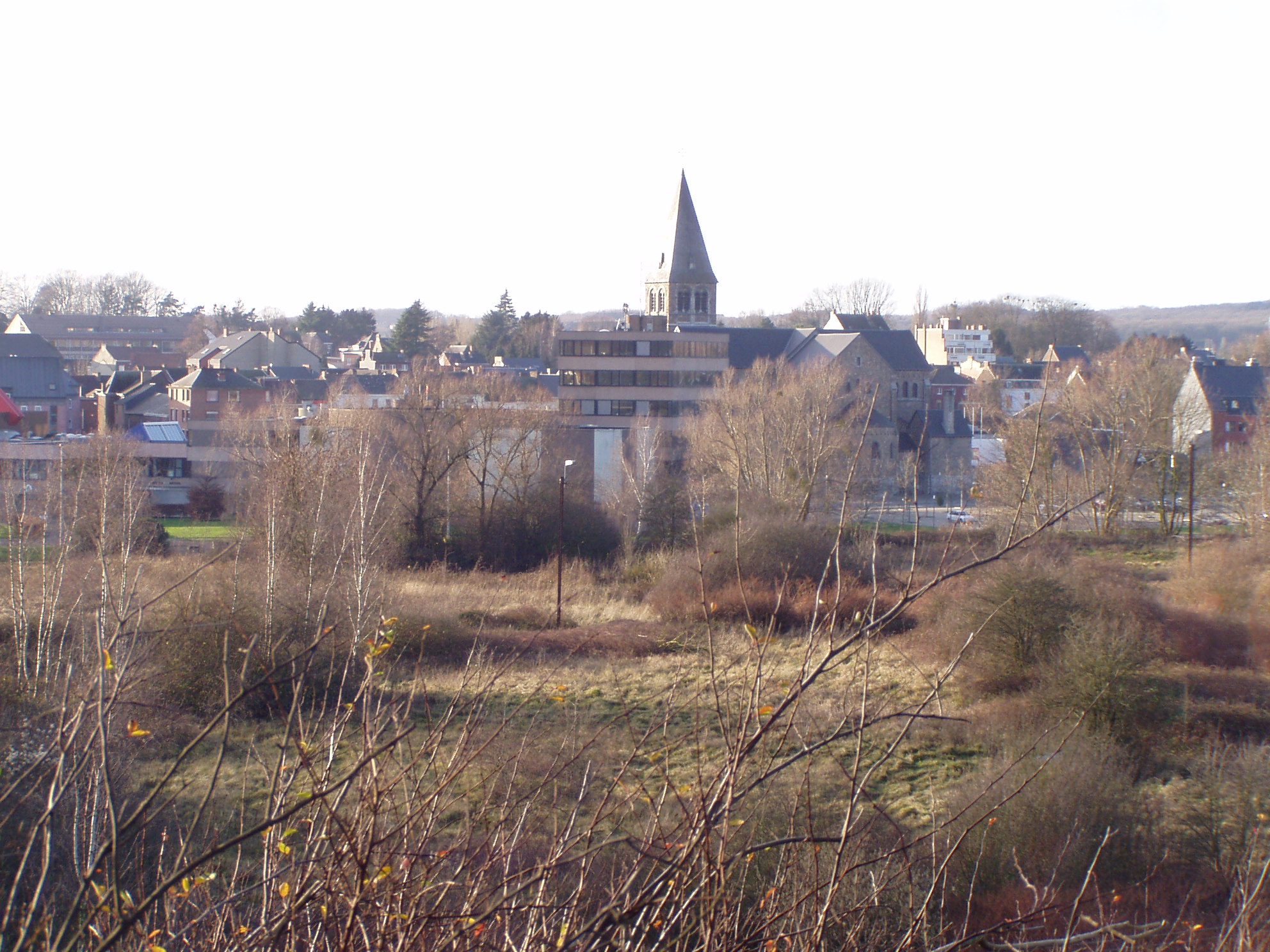
View of Auvelais

Auvelais (Walloon: Åvlè) is a town of Wallonia and a district of the municipality of Sambreville, located in the province of Namur, Belgium. The town lies in a meander of the River Sambre.

The town of Auvelais was formed in 1809 from the merger of the villages of Auvelais-la-Comté and Auvelais-le-Voisin. In 1977, as part of the post-1974 fusion of the Belgian municipalities, Auvelais became part of the newly created municipality of Sambreville, serving as the administrative centre.

== Landmarks ==
- The neo-Romanesque Eglise Saint-Victor, built in 1911, stands in the centre of town. In the northern part of the town, north of the Sambre, is the Eglise Saint-Barbe.
- There is a French military cemetery, burial place for fallen French Army soldiers from the First World War. The cemetery features a Breton lighthouse.
- The town contains a crossing over the River Sambre, which is where an Imperial German Army division commanded by General Erich Ludendorff broke through Charles Lanrezac's Fifth French Army defenses during the Battle of Charleroi at the beginning of World War I.

== Famous people ==
- Aeroplane
- Kevyn Ista
- Christophe and Olivier Rochus
