= Couillet, Belgium =

Couillet Couyet (Walloon)
- Former municipality of Belgium
- Coat of arms

- Location in the municipality of Charleroi

- Location in Belgium
- Coordinates: 50°24′N 4°26′E
- Country: Belgium
- Region: Wallonia
- Community: French Community
- Province: Hainaut
- Municipality: Charleroi

Area
  - Total: 4.81 sq mi (12.47 km^{2})

Population (2001)
  - Total: 12,546
- Time zone: UTC+1 (CET)
  - Summer (DST): UTC+2 (CEST)
- Postal code: 6010
- Area code: 071

Couillet ([kujɛ]; Walloon: Couyet) is a town of Wallonia and district of the municipality of Charleroi, located in the province of Hainaut, Belgium.

It was a municipality of its own before the merger of the municipalities in 1977.

== Culture ==
The local theater company playing in Walloon language, the "Cercle (royal) wallon de Couillet", won the "Grand Prix du Roi Albert I" Walloon-speaking theater contest in 1932, 1952 and 1976.

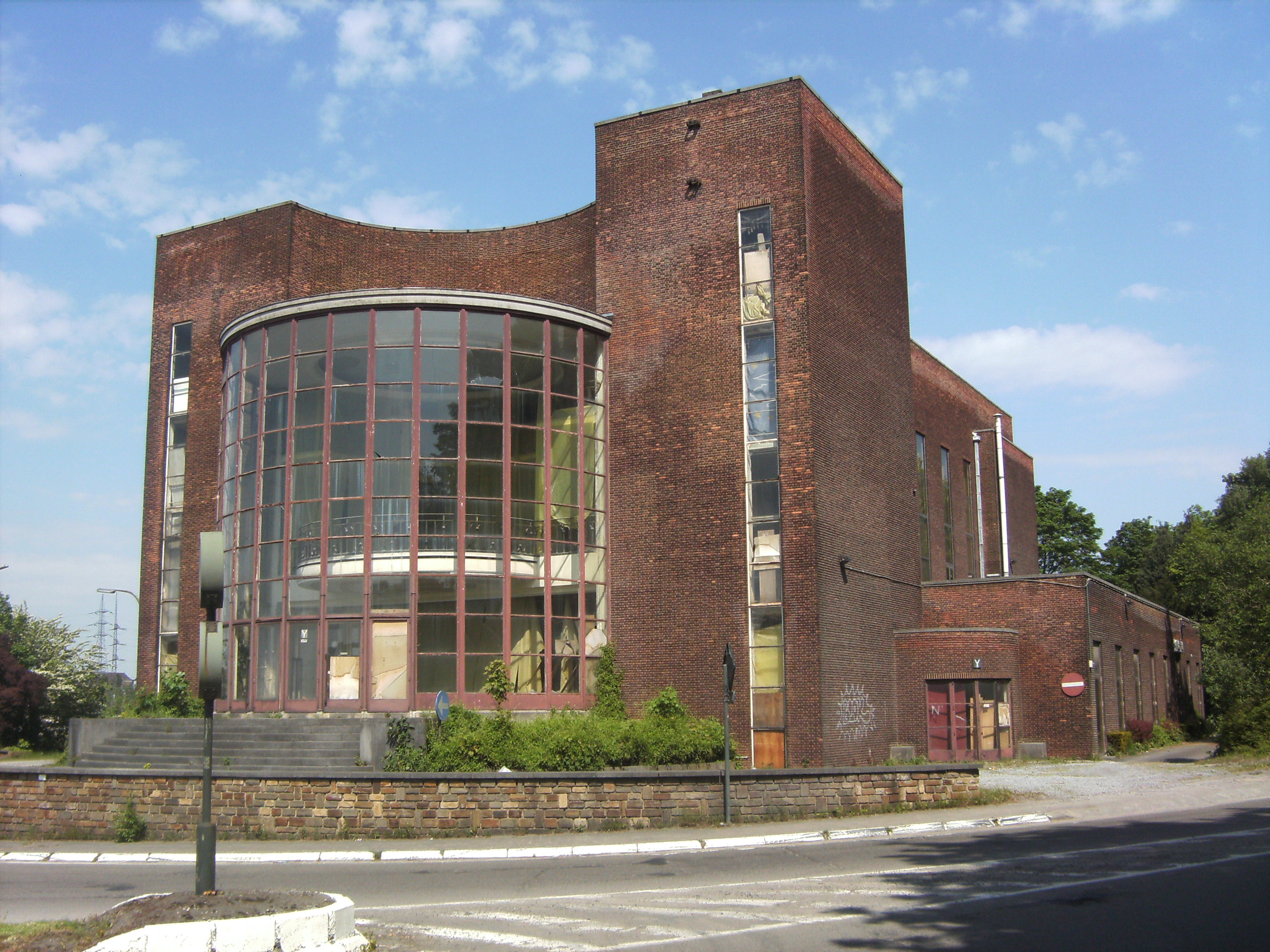
Solvay fraternity (1937-1939)

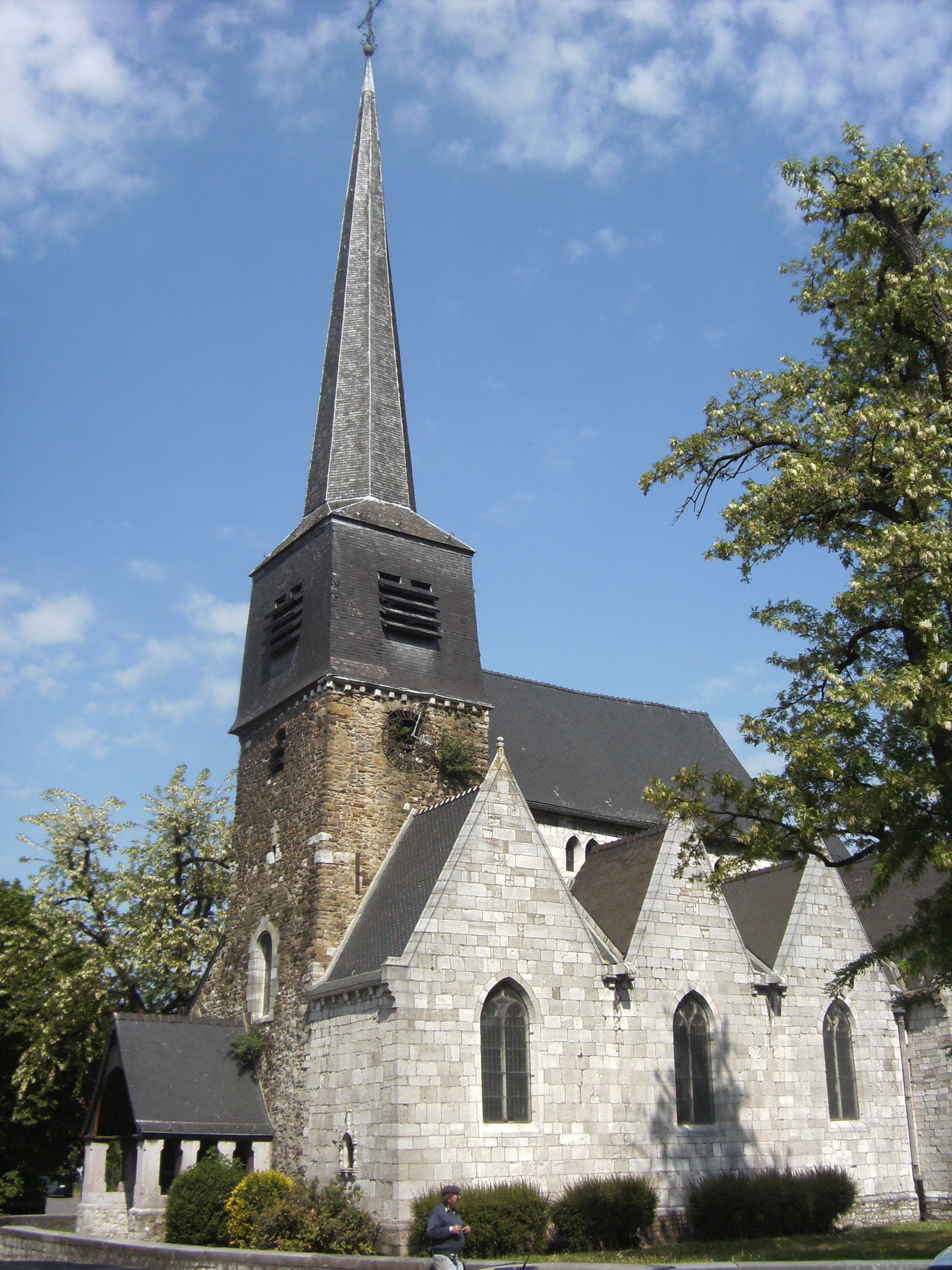
Saint Lawrence church (16th century)

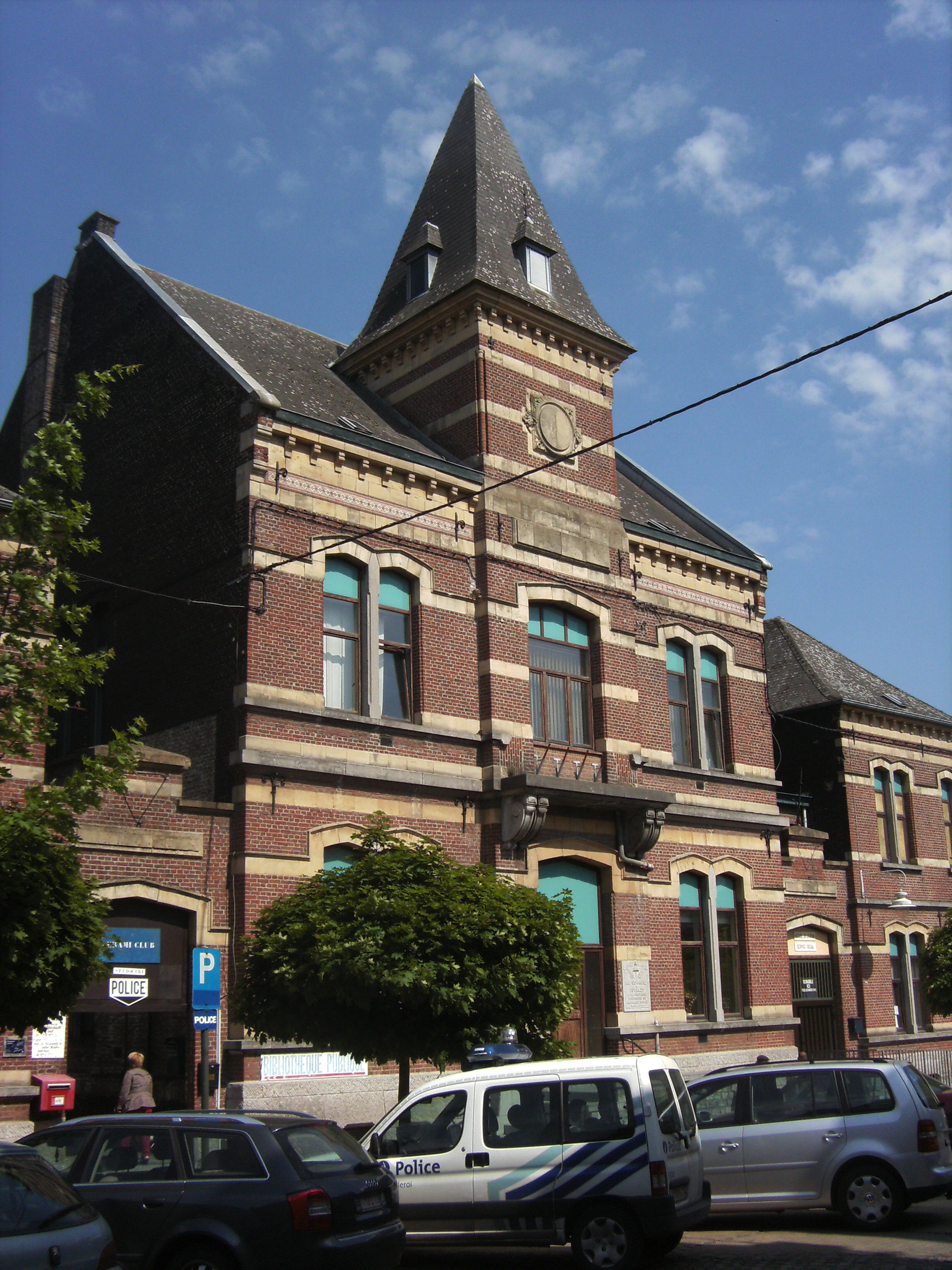
Former town hall (1882)

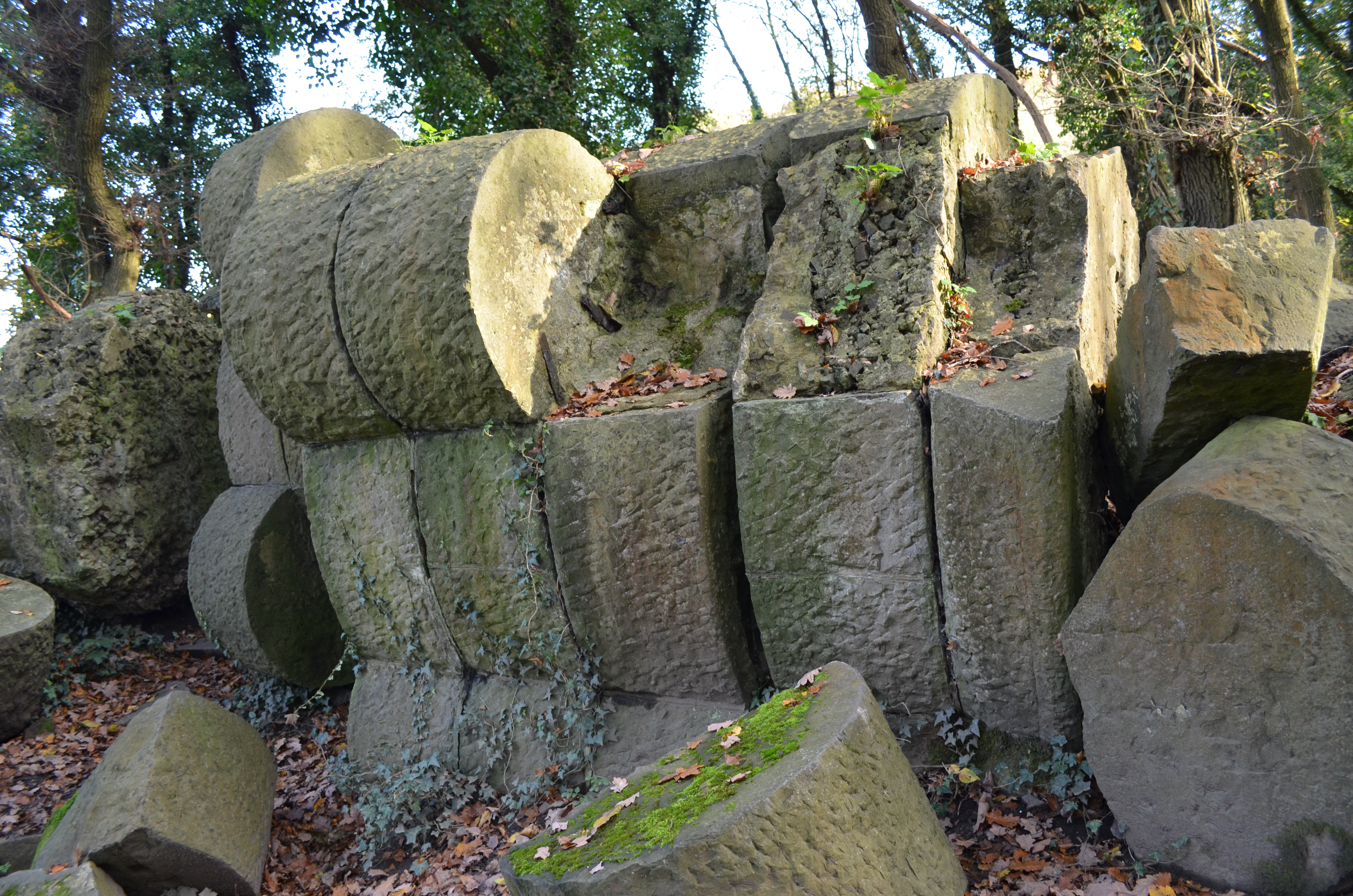
German Monument "Den Kameraden" from 1915, blasted in 1920.
