= Bouge =

Sub-municipality of the city of Namur, Belgium

Bouge Boudje (Walloon)
- Sub-municipality of Namur
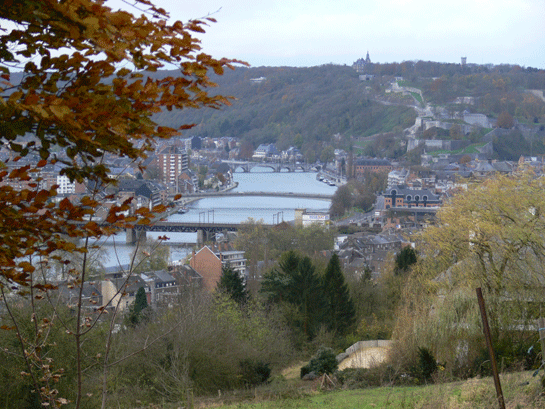

- Location of Bouge in Namur
- Interactive map of Bouge
- Location within Belgium Location within Namur Province
- Coordinates: 50°28′00″N 4°53′00″E
- Country: Belgium
- Community: French Community
- Region: Wallonia
- Province: Namur
- Arrondissement: Namur
- Municipality: Namur

Area
  - Total: 4.86 km^{2} (1.88 sq mi)

Population (2020-01-01)
  - Total: 4,515
  - Density: 929/km^{2} (2,410/sq mi)
- Postal codes: 5004
- Area codes: 081

Bouge (French pronunciation: [buʒ]; Walloon: Boudje) is a sub-municipality of the city of Namur located in the province of Namur, Wallonia, Belgium. It was a separate municipality until 1977. On 1 January 1977, it was merged into Namur.
