= Tamines =

Tamines Tamene (Walloon)
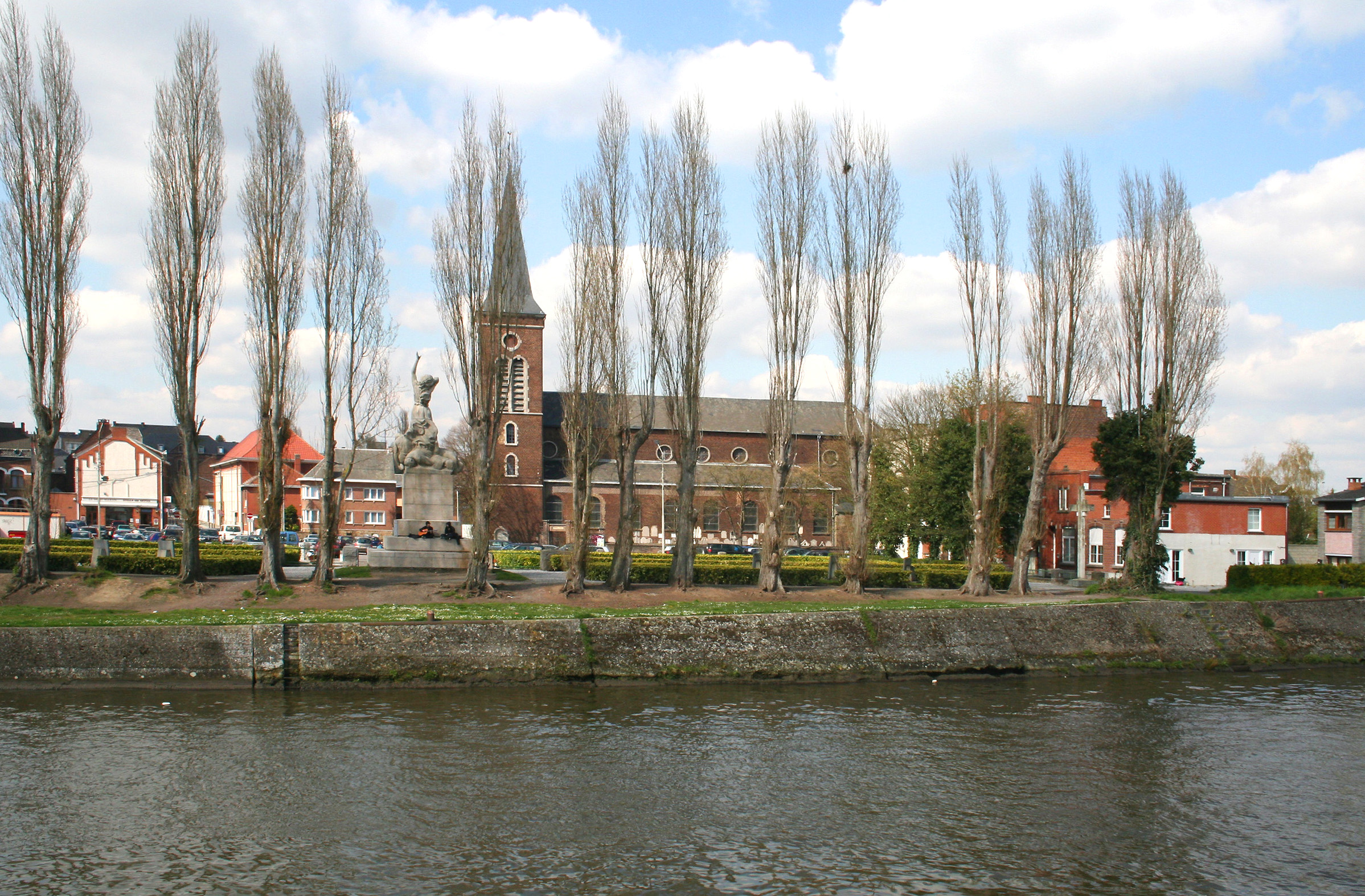
- Tamines

- Location within Belgium Location within Europe
- Coordinates: 50°25′55″N 04°36′43″E
- Country: Belgium
- Region: Wallonia
- Province: Namur
- Municipality: Sambreville

Tamines (French pronunciation: [tamin]; Walloon: Tamene) is a village of Wallonia and a district of the municipality of Sambreville, located in the province of Namur, Belgium.

During the Middle Ages, there was a seat of an alderman in the village, which had strong connections to the priory in Oignies on the other side of the Sambre. From the 18th century, coal mining started in the village, and by 1899 most of the area of the village was used for coal mining. The mine closed in 1965. The village was connected to the Charleroi–Namur railway line already in 1843. During World War I, 613 villagers were killed by German troops on 22 August 1914, during the Rape of Belgium. Almost 300 houses were also destroyed during the war.
