= 45th Reserve Division (German Empire) =

45th Reserve Division (45. Reserve-Division)
- Active: 1914–1919
- Country: Germany
- Branch: Army
- Type: Infantry
- Size: Approx. 15,000
- Engagements: World War I: Battle of the Somme, Second Battle of the Aisne, Passchendaele, German spring offensive, Second Battle of the Marne

The 45th Reserve Division (45. Reserve-Division) was a unit of the Imperial German Army in World War I. The division was formed in August 1914 and organized over the next two months. It was part of the first wave of new divisions formed at the outset of World War I, which were numbered the 43rd through 54th Reserve Divisions. The division was disbanded in 1919 during the demobilization of the German Army after World War I. The division was part of XXIII Reserve Corps and was recruited primarily in the Prussian provinces of Pomerania and West Prussia, but the 212th Reserve Infantry Regiment was a Hanseatic regiment, raised in Hamburg and Bremen.

== Combat chronicle ==
The 45th Reserve Division fought on the Western Front, entering the line in October along the Yser and remaining there until April 1915, when it went into the fight for Ypres. The division remained in the Yser region until September 1916. In September, the division fought in the Battle of the Somme. Thereafter, it remained in the Aisne region until April 1917. In April and May 1917, it fought in the Second Battle of the Aisne, also known as the Third Battle of Champagne (and to the Germans as the Double Battle on the Aisne and in the Champagne). Thereafter, the division went into the trenchline around Verdun, remaining there until the end of September 1917, when it joined the Battle of Passchendaele. The division then returned to Verdun. In 1918, it fought in the German spring offensive, including the breakthrough at St. Quentin and the follow-on battles in the Montdidier-Noyon region. It later saw action in the Second Battle of the Marne and the Meuse-Argonne Offensive. In 1918, Allied intelligence rated the division as second class.

== Order of battle on formation ==
The 45th Reserve Division was initially organized as a square division, with essentially the same organization as the reserve divisions formed on mobilization. The order of battle of the 45th Reserve Division on September 10, 1914, was as follows:

- 89. Reserve-Infanterie-Brigade
  - Reserve-Infanterie-Regiment Nr. 211
  - Reserve-Infanterie-Regiment Nr. 212
- 90. Reserve-Infanterie-Brigade
  - Reserve-Infanterie-Regiment Nr. 209
  - Reserve-Infanterie-Regiment Nr. 210
  - Reserve-Jäger-Bataillon Nr. 17
- Reserve-Kavallerie-Abteilung Nr. 45
- Reserve-Feldartillerie-Regiment Nr. 45
- Reserve-Pionier-Kompanie Nr. 45

== Order of battle on March 30, 1918 ==
The 45th Reserve Division was triangularized in September 1916. Over the course of the war, other changes took place, including the formation of artillery and signals commands and a pioneer battalion. The order of battle on March 30, 1918, was as follows:

- 90. Reserve-Infanterie-Brigade
  - Reserve-Infanterie-Regiment Nr. 210
  - Reserve-Infanterie-Regiment Nr. 211
  - Reserve-Infanterie-Regiment Nr. 212
- Reserve-Kavallerie-Abteilung Nr. 45
- Artillerie-Kommandeur 45
  - Reserve-Feldartillerie-Regiment Nr. 45
  - I.Bataillon/Fußartillerie-Regiment Nr. 20
- Pionier-Bataillon Nr. 345
- Divisions-Nachrichten-Kommandeur 445
