= Battle of Passchendaele =

1917 campaign of the First World War

Battle of Passchendaele (Third Battle of Ypres)
- Part of the Western Front of the First World War
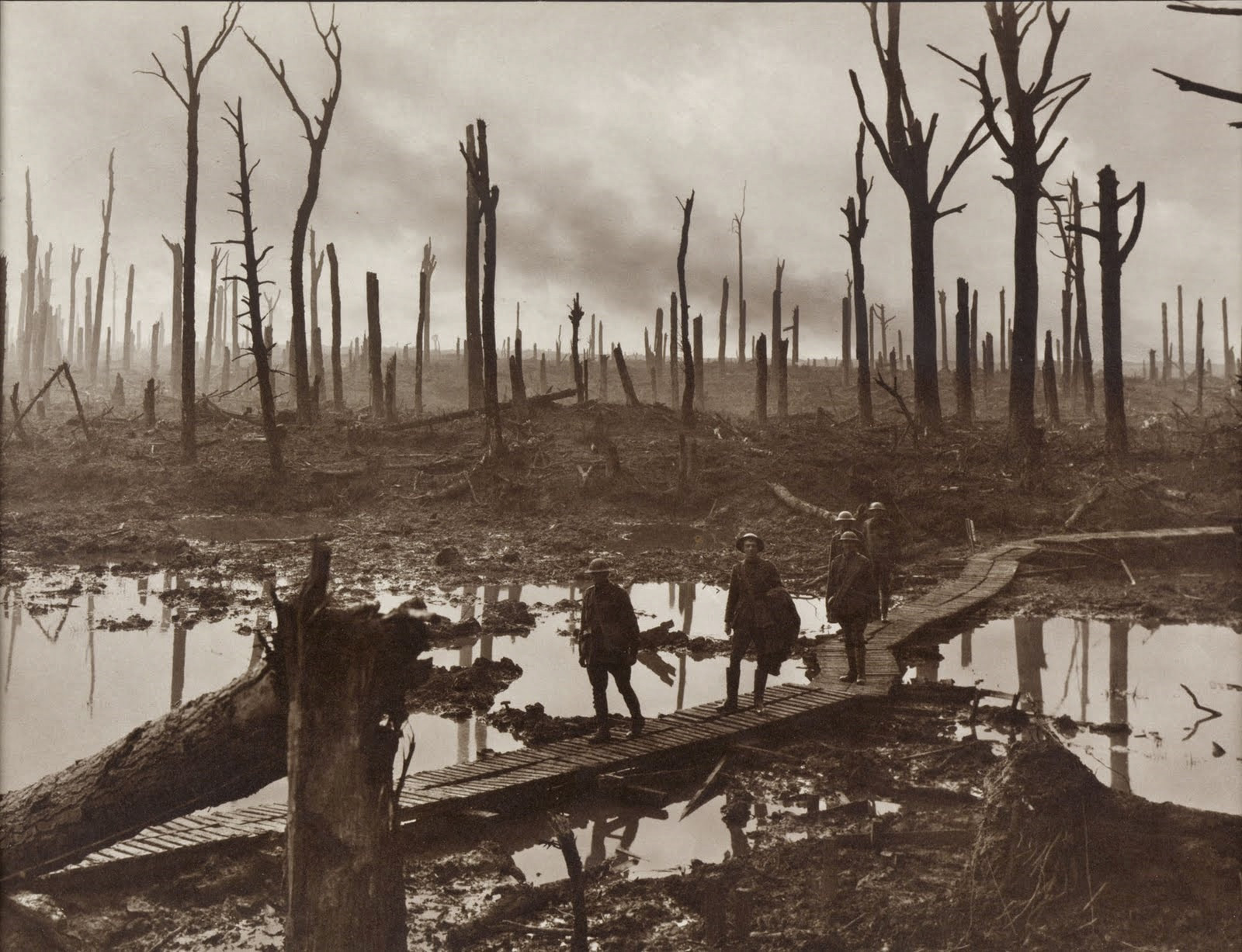
- Australian gunners on a duckboard track in Château Wood, near Hooge, 29 October 1917. Photo by Frank Hurley.
Date	31 July – 10 November 1917; (3 months, 1 week and 3 days)
Location	Passchendaele, Ypres Salient, Belgium 50°54′1″N 3°1′16″E
Result	See Analysis section

Belligerents
British Empire; United Kingdom; Canada; Australia; New Zealand; South Africa; India; Newfoundland; Rhodesia; France; Belgium	German Empire

Commanders and leaders
Douglas Haig; Hubert Gough; Herbert Plumer; François Anthoine; Louis Ruquoy	Erich Ludendorff; Rupprecht of Bavaria; Friedrich Sixt von Armin

Strength
(British Empire) 50 divisions; (French Third Republic) 6 divisions	(German Empire) 77–83 divisions

Casualties and losses
240,000–448,614; (disputed, see Casualties section)	217,000–400,000; including 24,065 prisoners (disputed, see Casualties section)
- Passchendaele (Passendale) a Belgian village in the Zonnebeke municipality of West Flanders province.

The Third Battle of Ypres (German: Dritte Flandernschlacht; French: Troisième Bataille des Flandres; Dutch: Derde Slag om Ieper), also known as the Battle of Passchendaele (/ˈpæʃəndeɪl/ PASH-ən-dayl), was a campaign of the First World War, fought by the Allies against the German Empire. (Note: Passchendaele is the common English title. The British Battles Nomenclature Committee Report of 1922 called the Flanders Offensive of 1917 "The Battle of Messines 1917" (7–14 June) and "The Battles of Ypres 1917" (31 July – 10 November). The battles are known to the British as the Battle of Messines 1917 (7–14 June), the Battle of Pilckem Ridge (31 July – 2 August), the Battle of Langemarck (16–18 August), the Battle of Menin Road Ridge (20–25 September), the Battle of Polygon Wood (26 September – 3 October) the Battle of Broodseinde (4 October), the Battle of Poelcappelle (9 October), the First Battle of Passchendaele (12 October) and the Second Battle of Passchendaele (26 October – 10 November). In German works it is the (Kampf um den Wijtschatebogen) (The Battle of the Wijtschate Salient) and the (Flandernschlacht) (Battle of Flanders) in five periods, First Battle of Flanders (31 July – 9 August), Second Battle of Flanders (9–25 August), Third Battle of Flanders (20 September – 8 October) Fourth Battle of Flanders (9–21 October) and the Fifth Battle of Flanders (22 October – 5 December).) The battle took place on the Western Front, from July to November 1917, for control of the ridges south and east of the Belgian city of Ypres in West Flanders, as part of a strategy decided by the Entente at conferences in November 1916 and May 1917. Passchendaele (now Passendale) lies on the last ridge east of Ypres, 5 mi (8 km) from Roulers (now Roeselare), a junction of the Bruges-(Brugge)-to-Kortrijk railway. The station at Roulers was on the main supply route of the German 4th Army. Once Passchendaele Ridge had been captured, the Allied advance was to continue to a line from Thourout (now Torhout) to Couckelaere (Koekelare).

Further operations and a British supporting attack along the Belgian coast from Nieuport (Nieuwpoort), combined with an amphibious landing (Operation Hush), were to have reached Bruges and then the Dutch frontier. Although a general withdrawal had seemed inevitable in early October, the Germans were able to avoid one due to the resistance of the 4th Army, unusually wet weather in August, the beginning of the autumn rains in October and the diversion of British and French resources to Italy. The campaign ended in November, when the Canadian Corps captured Passchendaele, apart from local attacks in December and early in the new year. The Battle of the Lys (Fourth Battle of Ypres) and the Fifth Battle of Ypres of 1918, were fought before the Allies occupied the Belgian coast and reached the Dutch frontier.

A campaign in Flanders was controversial in 1917 and has remained so. The British Prime Minister, David Lloyd George, opposed the offensive, as did General Ferdinand Foch, the Chief of Staff of the French Army. Field Marshal Sir Douglas Haig, commander of the British Expeditionary Force (BEF) did not receive approval for the Flanders operation from the War Cabinet until 25 July. Matters of dispute by the participants, writers and historians since 1917 include the wisdom of pursuing an offensive strategy in the wake of the Nivelle Offensive, rather than waiting for the arrival of the American Expeditionary Force (AEF) in France.

Controversies also debated are the choice of Flanders, its climate, the selection of General Hubert Gough and the Fifth Army to conduct the offensive and debates over the nature of the opening attack and between advocates of shallow and deeper objectives. Also debated are the time between the Battle of Messines (7–14 June) and the first Allied attack (the Battle of Pilckem Ridge, 31 July) the extent to which the French Army mutinies influenced the British, the effect of the exceptional weather, the decision to continue the offensive in October and the human costs of the campaign.

== Background ==
=== Flanders ===
==== 1914 ====
Belgium had been recognised in the Treaty of London (1839) as a sovereign and neutral state after the secession of the southern provinces of the Netherlands in 1830. The German invasion of Belgium on 4 August 1914, in violation of Article VII of the treaty, was the British casus belli against Germany. British military operations in Belgium began with the arrival of the British Expeditionary Force (BEF) at Mons on 22 August. Operations in Flanders began during the Race to the Sea, reciprocal attempts by the French and German armies to turn their opponents' northern flank, through Picardy, Artois and Flanders. On 10 October, Lieutenant-General Erich von Falkenhayn, the Chief of Staff of the Oberste Heeresleitung (OHL, supreme army command), ordered an attack towards Dunkirk and Calais, followed by a turn south behind the Allied armies, to gain a decisive victory. On 16 October, the Belgians and some French reinforcements began the defence of western Belgium and the French Channel ports, at the Battle of the Yser. When the German offensive failed, Falkenhayn ordered the capture of Ypres to gain a local advantage. By 18 November, the First Battle of Ypres had also ended in failure, at a cost of 160,000 German casualties. In December, the British Admiralty began discussions with the War Office, for a combined operation to re-occupy the Belgian coast but were obliged to conform to French strategy and participate in offensives further south.

==== 1915 ====
Large British offensive operations in Flanders were not possible in 1915, due to a lack of resources. The Germans conducted their own Flanders offensive at the Second Battle of Ypres (22 April – 15 May 1915), making the Ypres salient more costly to defend. Sir Douglas Haig succeeded Sir John French as Commander-in-Chief of the BEF on 19 December. A week after his appointment, Haig met Rear-Admiral Reginald Bacon, who emphasised the importance of obtaining control of the Belgian coast, to end the threat posed by German U-boats. (Note: Page 2 of the Official History gives Bacon's rank as Vice-Admiral. His Oxford Dictionary of National Biography article states that he was promoted to this rank late in 1916 and that he was knighted (KCVO) in 1916.) Haig was sceptical of a coastal operation, believing that a landing from the sea would be far more difficult than anticipated and that an advance along the coast would require so much preparation, that the Germans would have ample warning. Haig preferred an advance from Ypres, to bypass the flooded area around the Yser and the coast, before attempting a coastal attack to clear the coast to the Dutch border.

==== 1916 ====
Minor operations took place in the Ypres salient in 1916, some being German initiatives to distract the Allies from their preparations for the offensive at Verdun and later attempts to divert Allied resources from the Battle of the Somme. Other operations were begun by the British to regain territory or to evict the Germans from ground overlooking their positions. Engagements took place on 12 February at Boesinghe and on 14 February at Hooge and Sanctuary Wood. There were actions from 14 to 15 February and 1 to 4 March at The Bluff, 27 March – 16 April at the St Éloi Craters and the Battle of Mont Sorrel from 2 to 13 June. In January 1917, the Second Army (General Herbert Plumer) with the II Anzac, IX, X and VIII corps, held the Western Front in Flanders from Laventie to Boesinghe, with eleven divisions and up to two in reserve. There was much trench mortaring, mining and raiding by both sides and from January to May, the Second Army suffered 20,000 casualties. In May, reinforcements began arriving in Flanders from the south; the II Corps headquarters and 17 divisions had arrived by the end of the month.

In January 1916, Plumer began to plan offensives against Messines Ridge, Lille and Houthulst Forest. General Henry Rawlinson was also ordered to plan an attack from the Ypres Salient on 4 February; planning continued but the Battle of Verdun and the Battle of the Somme took up the rest of the year. In November, Haig, the French commander-in-chief Joseph Joffre and the other Allies met at Chantilly. The commanders agreed on a strategy of simultaneous attacks, to overwhelm the Central Powers on the Western, Eastern and Italian fronts, by the first fortnight of February 1917. A meeting in London of the Admiralty and the General Staff urged that the Flanders operation be undertaken in 1917 and Joffre replied on 8 December, agreeing to a Flanders campaign after the spring offensive. The plan for a year of attrition offensives on the Western Front, with the main effort to be made in the summer by the BEF, was scrapped by the new French Commander-in-Chief Robert Nivelle in favour of a return to a strategy of decisive battle.

=== Allied strategy ===
Nivelle planned preliminary offensives to pin German reserves by the British at Arras and the French between the Somme and the Oise, then a French breakthrough offensive on the Aisne, followed by pursuit and exploitation. Haig had reservations and on 6 January Nivelle agreed to a proviso that if the first two parts of the operation failed to lead to a breakthrough, the operations would be stopped and the British could move their forces north for the Flanders offensive, which was of great importance to the British government. On 23 January, Haig wrote that it would take six weeks to move British troops and equipment to Flanders and on 14 March, noted that the Messines Ridge operation could begin in May. On 21 March, he wrote to Nivelle that it would take two months to prepare the offensive from Messines to Steenstraat but that the Messines operation could be ready in five or six weeks.

The main French attack took place from 9 April to 9 May and failed to achieve a breakthrough. On 16 May, Haig wrote that he had divided the Flanders operation into two parts, one to take Messines Ridge and the main attack several weeks later. British determination to clear the Belgian coast took on more urgency after the Germans resumed unrestricted submarine warfare on 1 February 1917. On 1 May 1917, Haig wrote that the Nivelle Offensive had weakened the German army but that an attempt at a decisive blow would be premature. The wearing-out process would continue on a front where the Germans had no room to retreat. Even limited success would improve the tactical situation in the Ypres salient, reducing the exceptional wastage, even in quiet periods. In early May, Haig set the date for the Flanders offensive, the attack on Messines Ridge to begin on 7 June.

=== Kerensky offensive ===
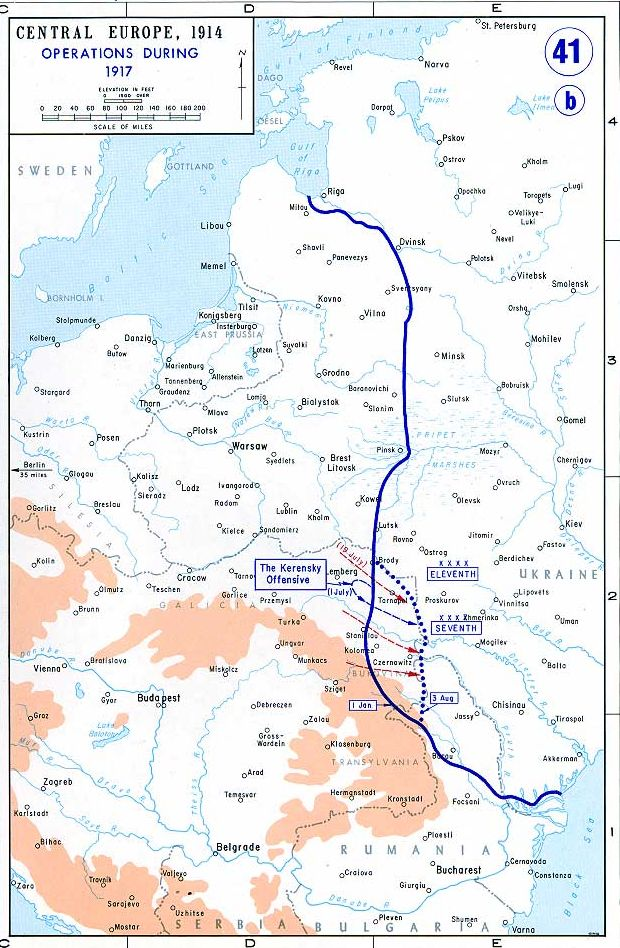
The Eastern Front in 1917

The Russian army conducted the Kerensky Offensive in Galicia, to honour the agreement struck with the Allies at the Chantilly meeting of 15 to 16 November 1916. After a brief period of success from 1 to 19 July, the Russian offensive was contained by the German and Austro-Hungarian armies, which counter-attacked and forced the Russian armies to retreat. On the Baltic coast from 1 to 5 September 1917, the Germans attacked with their strategic reserve of six divisions and captured Riga. In Operation Albion (September–October 1917), the Germans took the islands at the mouth of the Gulf of Riga. The British and French commanders on the Western Front had to reckon on the German western army (Westheer) being strengthened by reinforcements from the Ostheer on the Eastern Front by late 1917. Haig wished to exploit the diversion of German forces in Russia for as long as it continued and urged the British War Cabinet to commit the maximum amount of manpower and munitions to the battle in Flanders.

== Prelude ==
=== Ypres salient ===
Ypres is overlooked by Kemmel Hill in the south-west and from the east by a line of low hills running south-west to north-east. Wytschaete (Wijtschate) and Hill 60 are to the east of Verbrandenmolen, Hooge, Polygon Wood and Passchendaele (Passendale). The high point of the ridge is at Wytschaete, 7,000 yd (4.0 mi; 6.4 km) from Ypres, while at Hollebeke the ridge is 4,000 yd (2.3 mi; 3.7 km) distant and recedes to 7,000 yd (4.0 mi; 6.4 km) at Polygon Wood. Wytschaete is about 150 ft (46 m) above the plain; on the Ypres–Menin road at Hooge, the elevation is about 100 ft (30 m) and 70 ft (21 m) at Passchendaele. The rises are slight, apart from the vicinity of Zonnebeke, which has a gradient of 1:33. From Hooge and further east, the slope is 1:60 and near Hollebeke, it is 1:75; the heights are subtle and resemble a saucer lip around the city. The main ridge has spurs sloping east and one is particularly noticeable at Wytschaete, which runs 2 mi (3.2 km) south-east to Messines (Mesen) with a gentle slope on the east side and a 1:10 decline westwards. Further south, is the muddy valley of the River Douve, Ploegsteert Wood (Plugstreet to the British) and Hill 63. West of Messines Ridge is the parallel Wulverghem (Spanbroekmolen) Spur and on the east side, the Oosttaverne Spur, which is also parallel to the main ridge. The general aspect south and east of Ypres, is one of low ridges and dips, gradually flattening northwards beyond Passchendaele, into a featureless plain.

Possession of the higher ground to the south and east of Ypres, gives an army ample scope for ground observation, enfilade fire and converging artillery bombardments. An occupier also has the advantage that artillery deployments and the movement of reinforcements, supplies and stores can be screened from view. The ridge had woods from Wytschaete to Zonnebeke giving good cover, some being of notable size, like Polygon Wood and those later named Battle Wood, Shrewsbury Forest and Sanctuary Wood. In 1914, the woods usually had undergrowth but by 1917, artillery bombardments had reduced the woods to tree stumps, shattered tree trunks tangled with barbed wire and more wire festooning the ground, which was full of shell-holes; fields in the gaps between the woods were 800–1,000 yd (730–910 m) wide and devoid of cover. The main road to Ypres from Poperinge to Vlamertinge is in a defile, easily observed from the ridge. Roads in the area were unpaved, except for the main ones from Ypres, with occasional villages and houses dotted along them. The lowland west of the ridge was a mixture of meadows and fields, with high hedgerows dotted with trees, cut by streams and a network of drainage ditches emptying into canals.

=== Topography ===
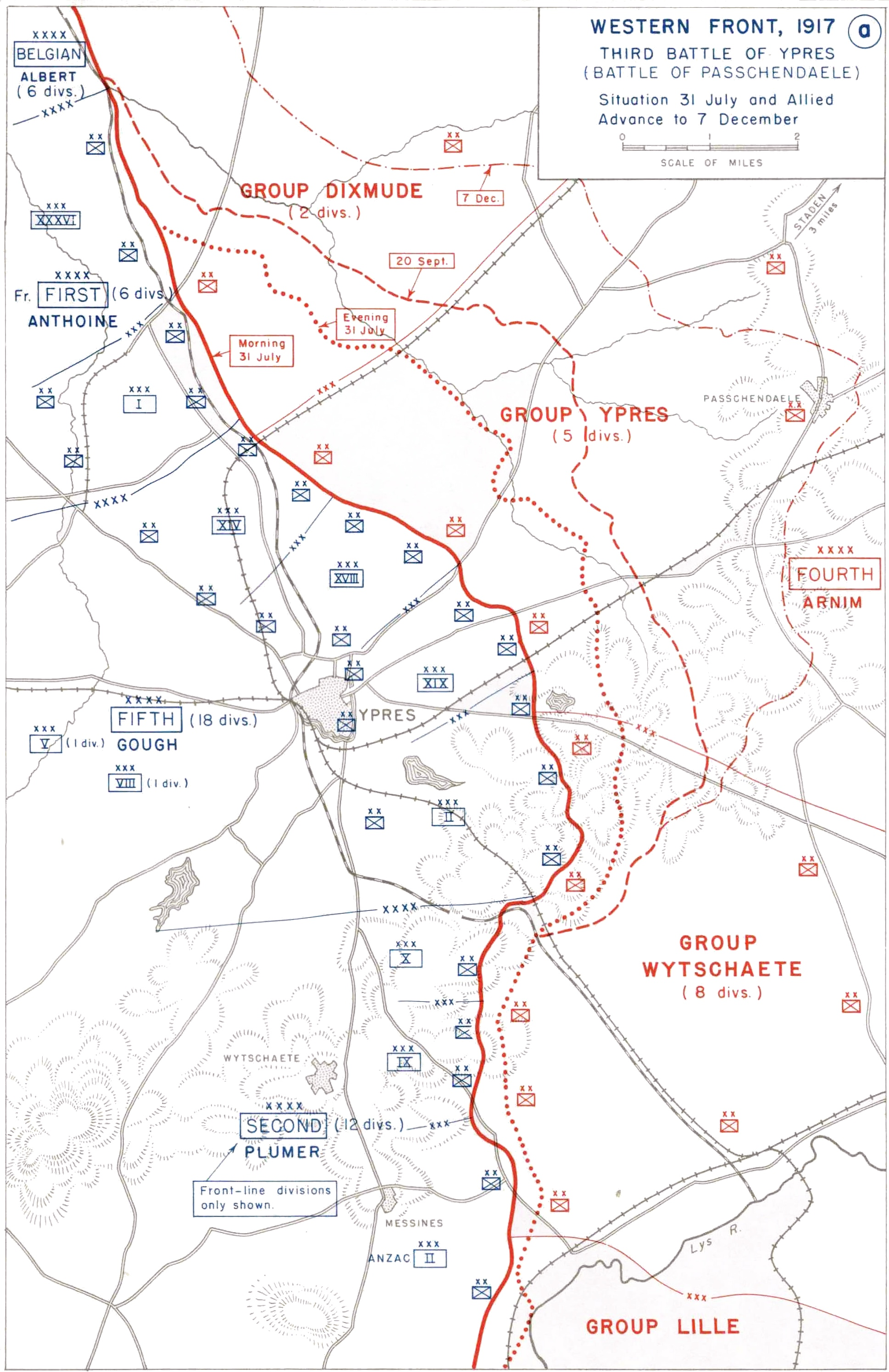
The progression of the battle and the general disposition of troops

In Flanders, sands, gravels and marls predominate, covered by silts in places. The coastal strip is sandy but a short way into the hinterland, the ground rises towards the Vale of Ypres, which before 1914 was a flourishing market garden. Ypres is 66 ft (20 m) above sea level; Bixschoote 4 mi (6.4 km) to the north is at 28 ft (8.5 m). To the east the land is at 66–82 ft (20–25 m) for several miles, with the Steenbeek river at 49 ft (15 m) near St Julien. There is a low ridge from Messines, 260 ft (80 m) at its highest point, running north-east past Clapham Junction at the west end of Gheluvelt plateau (2 1/2 miles from Ypres at 213 ft (65 m) and Gheluvelt, above 160 ft (50 m) to Passchendaele, (5 1/2 miles from Ypres at 160 ft (50 m) declining from there to a plain further north. Gradients vary from negligible, to 1:60 at Hooge and 1:33 at Zonnebeke.

Underneath the soil is London clay, sand and silt; according to the Commonwealth War Graves Commission categories of sand, sandy soils and well-balanced soils, Messines ridge is well-balanced soil and the ground around Ypres is sandy soil. The ground is drained by many streams, canals and ditches, which need regular maintenance. Since 1914 much of the drainage had been destroyed, though some parts were restored by land drainage companies from England. The British considered the area drier than Loos, Givenchy and Plugstreet Wood further south. A study of weather data recorded at Lille, 16 mi (26 km) from Ypres from 1867–1916, published in 1989, showed that August was more often dry than wet, that there was a trend towards dry autumns (September–November) and that average rainfall in October had decreased since the 1860s.

=== British plans ===
Preparations for operations in Flanders began in 1915, with the doubling of the Hazebrouck–Ypres rail line and the building of a new line from Bergues to Proven, which was doubled in early 1917. Progress on roads, rail lines, railheads and spurs in the Second Army zone was continuous and by mid-1917, gave the area the most efficient supply system of the BEF. Several plans and memoranda for a Flanders offensive were produced between January 1916 and May 1917, in which the writers tried to relate the offensive resources available to the terrain and the likely German defence. In early 1916, the importance of the capture of the Gheluvelt plateau for an advance further north was emphasised by Haig and the army commanders. On 14 February 1917, Colonel Norman MacMullen of GHQ proposed that the plateau be taken by a massed tank attack, reducing the need for artillery; in April a reconnaissance by Captain Giffard LeQuesne Martel found that the area was unsuitable for tanks.

On 9 February, Rawlinson, commander of the Fourth Army, suggested that Messines Ridge could be taken in one day and that the capture of the Gheluvelt plateau should be fundamental to the attack further north. He suggested that the southern attack from St Yves to Mont Sorrel should come first and that Mont Sorrel to Steenstraat should be attacked within 48 to 72 hours. After discussions with Rawlinson and Plumer and the incorporation of Haig's changes, Macmullen submitted his memorandum on 14 February. With amendments the memorandum became the GHQ 1917 plan. A week after the Battle of Messines Ridge, Haig gave his objectives to his army commanders, the wearing out of the enemy, securing the Belgian coast and connecting with the Dutch frontier by capturing Passchendaele ridge, followed by an advance on Roulers and Operation Hush, an attack along the coast with a combined amphibious landing. If manpower and artillery were insufficient, only the first part of the plan might be fulfilled. On 30 April, Haig told Gough, the Fifth Army commander, that he would lead the Northern Operation and the coastal force, although Cabinet approval for the offensive was not granted until 21 June. (Note: After mutinies had begun in the French armies, the British cabinet felt compelled to endorse the Flanders offensive, in the hope that more refusals to fight could be "averted by a great [military] success". Haig wrote that if the Allies could win the war in 1917, "the chief people to suffer would be the socialists".)

=== German defences ===
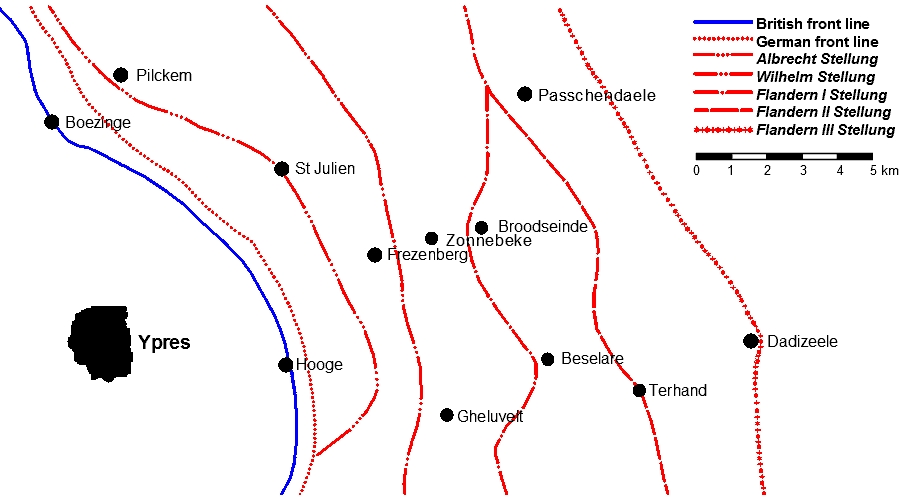
The British front line and the German defences in the area east of Ypres, mid-1917

The 4th Army held a front of 25 mi (40 km) with three Gruppen, composed of a corps headquarters and a varying complement of divisions; Group Staden, based on the headquarters of the Guards Reserve Corps was added later. Group Dixmude held 12 mi (19 km) with four front divisions and two Eingreif divisions, Group Ypres held 6 mi (9.7 km) from Pilckem to Menin Road with three front divisions and two Eingreif divisions and Group Wijtschate held a similar length of front south of the Menin road, with three front divisions and three Eingreif divisions. The Eingreif divisions were stationed behind the Menin and Passchendaele ridges. About 5 mi (8.0 km) further back, were four more Eingreif divisions and 7 mi (11 km) beyond them, another two in OHL reserve.

The Germans were anxious that the British would attempt to exploit the victory of the Battle of Messines, with an advance to the Tower Hamlets spur beyond the north end of Messines Ridge. On 9 June, Crown Prince Rupprecht proposed a withdrawal to the Flandern line east of Messines. Construction of defences began but was terminated after Fritz von Loßberg was appointed Chief of Staff of the 4th Army. Loßberg rejected the proposed withdrawal to the Flandern line and ordered that the front line east of the Oosttaverne line be held rigidly. The Flandernstellung (Flanders Position) along Passchendaele Ridge, in front of the Flandern line, would become Flandern I Stellung and a new position, Flandern II Stellung, would run west of Menin, northwards to Passchendaele. Construction of a Flandern III Stellung east of Menin northwards to Moorslede was also begun. From July 1917, the area east of Ypres was defended by the front position, the Albrechtstellung (second position), Wilhelmstellung (third position), Flandern I Stellung (fourth position), Flandern II Stellung (fifth position) and Flandern III Stellung, the sixth position (incomplete). Between the German defences lay villages such as Zonnebeke and Passchendaele, which were fortified and prepared for all-round defence.

On 25 June, Erich Ludendorff, the First Quartermaster General, suggested to Crown Prince Rupprecht that Group Ypres should withdraw to the Wilhelmstellung, leaving only outposts in the Albrechtstellung. On 30 June, the army group Chief of Staff, General von Kuhl, suggested a withdrawal to the Flandern I Stellung along Passchendaele ridge, meeting the old front line in the north near Langemarck and Armentières in the south. Such a withdrawal would avoid a hasty retreat from Pilckem Ridge and force the British into a time-consuming redeployment. Loßberg disagreed, believing that the British would launch a broad front offensive, that the ground east of the Sehnenstellung was easy to defend and that the Menin road ridge could be held if it was made the Schwerpunkt (point of main effort) of the German defensive system. Pilckem Ridge deprived the British of ground observation over the Steenbeek Valley, while the Germans could see the area from Passchendaele Ridge, allowing German infantry to be supported by observed artillery-fire. Loßberg's judgement was accepted and no withdrawal was made.

=== Battle of Messines ===
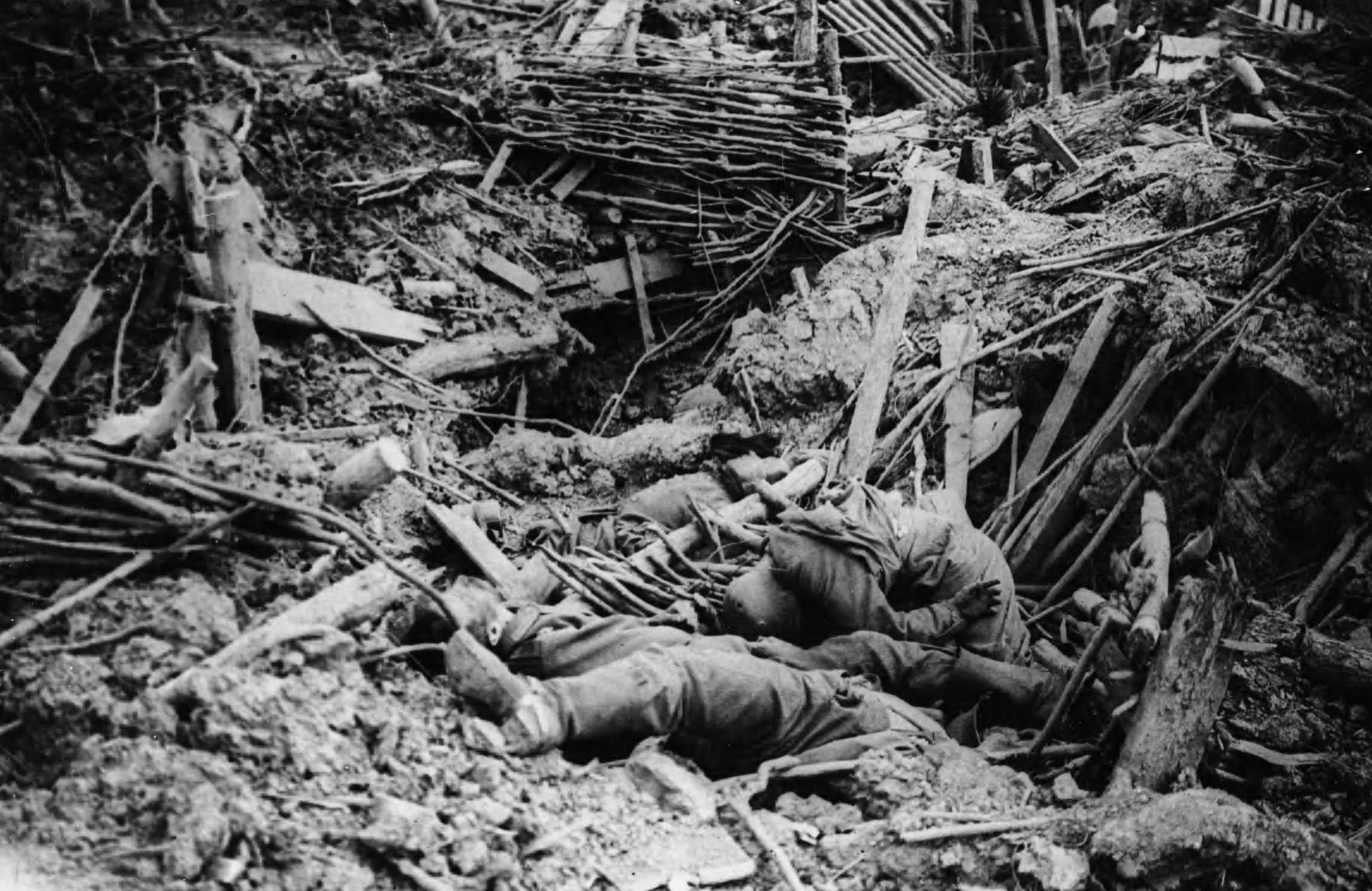
German trench destroyed by a mine explosion

The first stage in the British plan was a preparatory attack on the German positions south of Ypres at Messines Ridge. The Germans on the ridge had observation over Ypres and unless it was captured, observed enfilade artillery-fire could be fired against a British attack from the salient further north. Since mid-1915, the British had been mining under the German positions on the ridge and by June 1917, 21 mines had been filled with nearly 1,000,000 lb (454 t) of explosives. The Germans knew the British were mining and had taken counter-measures but they were surprised at the extent of the British effort.

Two of the mines failed to detonate but 19 went off on 7 June, at 3:10 a.m. British Summer Time. The final objectives were largely gained before dark and the British had fewer losses than the expected (50 per cent) in the initial attack. As the infantry advanced over the far edge of the ridge, German artillery and machine-guns east of the ridge opened fire and the British artillery was less able to suppress them. The attack removed the Germans from the dominating ground on the southern face of the Ypres salient, which the 4th Army had held since the First Battle of Ypres in 1914.

== Battles ==
=== July–August ===
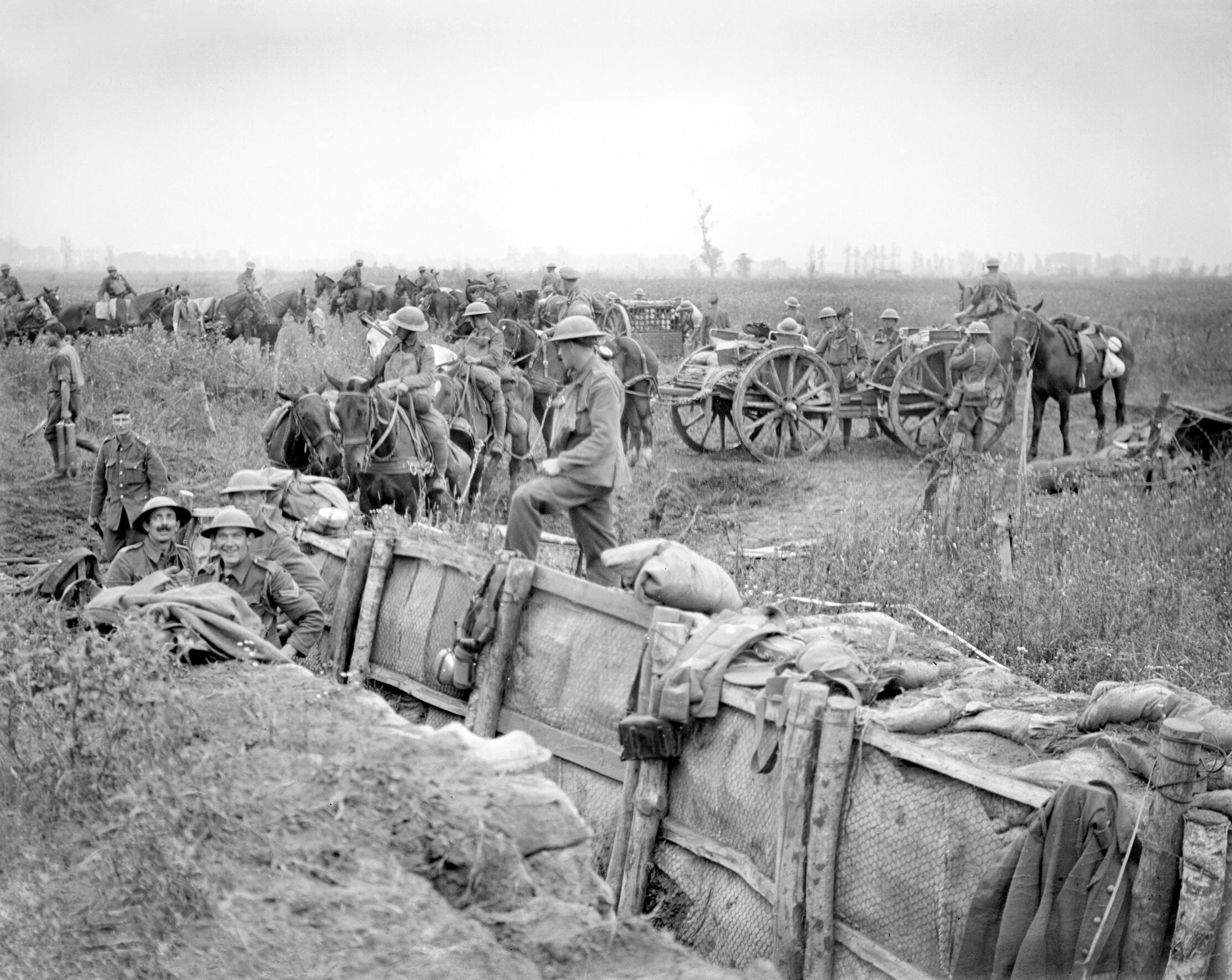
British 18-pounder battery taking up new positions near Boesinghe, 31 July

Haig selected Gough to command the offensive on 30 April and on 10 June Gough and the Fifth Army headquarters took over the Ypres salient north of Messines Ridge. Gough planned an offensive based on the GHQ 1917 plan and the instructions he had received from Haig. Gough held meetings with his corps commanders on 6 and 16 June, where the third objective, which included the Wilhelmstellung (third line), a second-day objective in earlier plans, was added to the two objectives due to be taken on the first day. A fourth objective, the red line, was also given for the first day, to be attempted by fresh troops, at the discretion of divisional and corps commanders, in places where the German defence had collapsed. The attack was not planned as a breakthrough operation and Flandern I Stellung, the fourth German defensive position, lay 10,000–12,000 yd (5.7–6.8 mi; 9.1–11.0 km) behind the front line and was not an objective on the first day.

The Fifth Army plan was more ambitious than the plans devised by Rawlinson and Plumer, which had involved an advance of 1,000–1,750 yd (910–1,600 m) on the first day, by compressing their first three attacks into one day instead of three. Major-General John Davidson, Director of Operations at GHQ, wrote in a memorandum that there was "ambiguity as to what was meant by a step-by-step attack with limited objectives" and suggested reverting to a 1,750 yd (1,600 m) advance on the first day to increase the concentration of British artillery. Gough stressed the need to plan to exploit opportunities to take ground left temporarily undefended, more likely in the first attack, which would have the benefit of long preparation. This had not been done in earlier battles and vacant ground, there for the taking, had been re-occupied by the Germans. At the end of June, Haig added a division to II Corps (Lieutenant-General Claud Jacob) from the Second Army and next day, after meeting with Gough and General Herbert Plumer, the Second Army commander, Haig endorsed the Fifth Army plan.

==== Battle of Pilckem Ridge ====
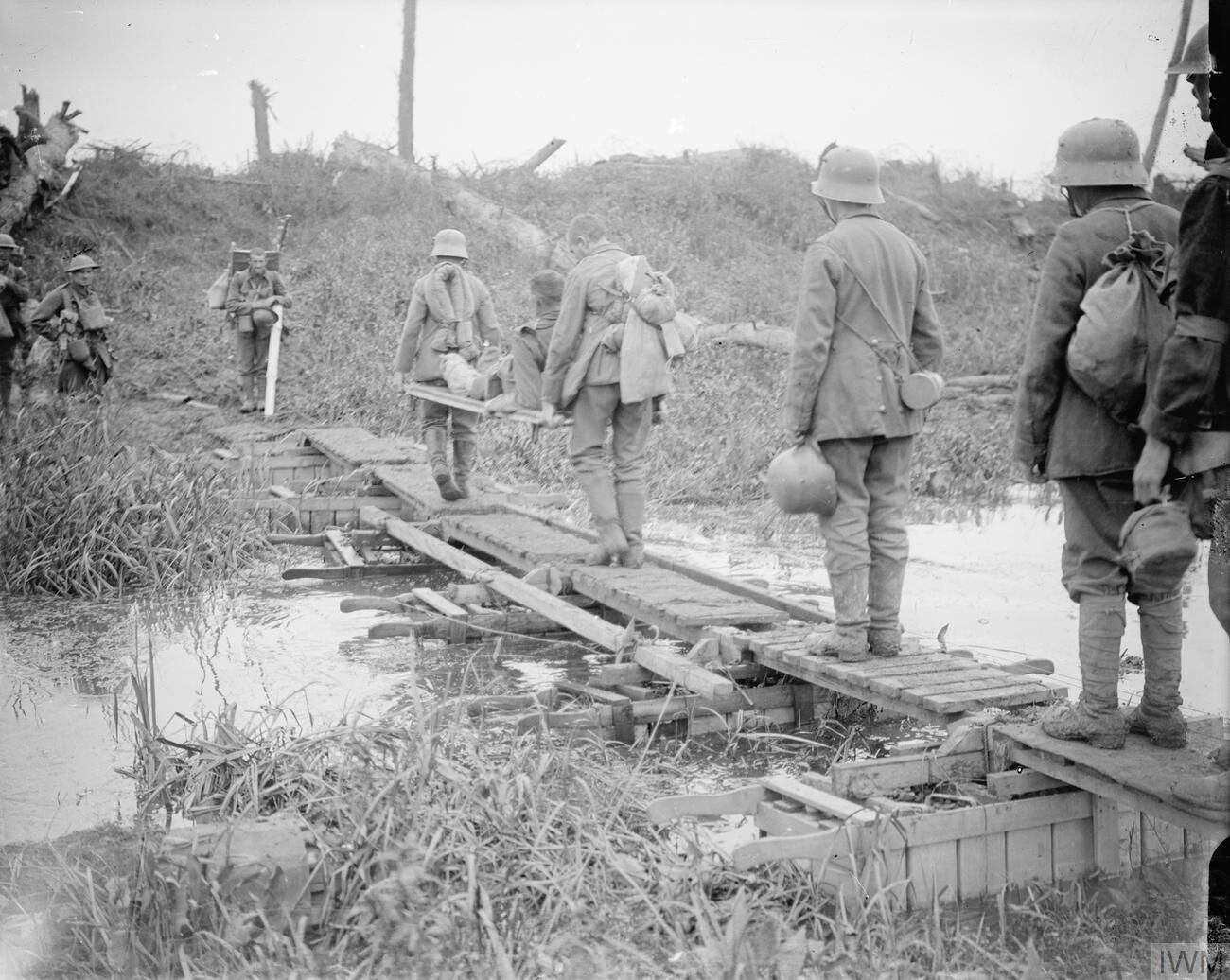
German prisoners and British wounded cross the Yser Canal near Boesinghe, 31 July 1917. (IWM Q5726)

The British attack began at 3:50 a.m. on 31 July; the attack was to commence at dawn but a layer of unbroken low cloud meant that it was still dark when the infantry advanced. The main attack, by II Corps across the Ghelveult Plateau to the south, confronted the principal German defensive concentration of artillery, ground-holding divisions (Stellungsdivisionen) and Eingreif (counter-attack) divisions. The attack had most success on the northern flank, on the fronts of XIV Corps and the French First Army, both of which advanced 2,500–3,000 yd (1.4–1.7 mi; 2.3–2.7 km) to the line of the Steenbeek river. In the centre, XVIII Corps and XIX Corps pushed forward to the line of the Steenbeek (black line) to consolidate and sent fresh troops towards the green line. On the XIX Corps front fresh troops advanced to the red line, for a move forward of about 4,000 yd (3,700 m). Group Ypres counter-attacked the flanks of the British break-in, supported by every artillery piece and aircraft within range, around noon. The Germans were able to drive the three British brigades back to the black line with 70 per cent casualties; the German advance was stopped at the black line by mud, artillery and machine-gun fire.

==== Capture of Westhoek ====
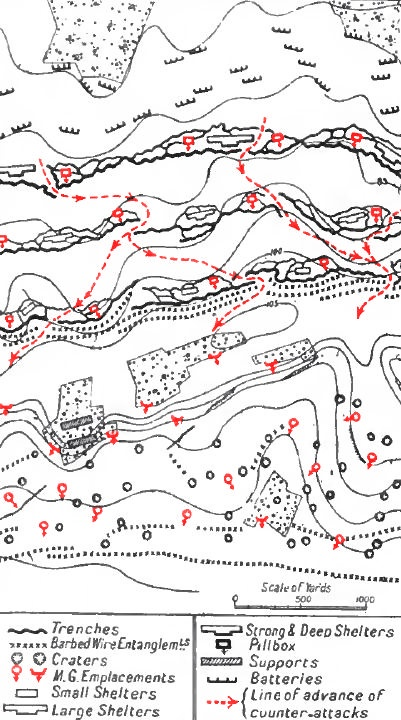
German defensive system, Flanders, mid-1917

After rain delays from 2 August, II Corps attacked again on 10 August, to capture the rest of the black line (second objective) on the Gheluvelt plateau. The infantry advance succeeded but German artillery-fire and infantry counter-attacks isolated the infantry of the 18th (Eastern) Division in Glencorse Wood. At about 7:00 p.m., German infantry attacked behind a smokescreen and recaptured all but the north-west corner of the wood; only the 25th Division gains on Westhoek Ridge to the north were held. Lieutenant-Colonel Albrecht von Thaer, Chief of Staff of Gruppe Wijtschate (Group Wytschaete, the headquarters of the IX Reserve Corps), noted that casualties after 14 days in the line averaged 1,500–2,000 men, compared to 4,000 men on the Somme in 1916 and that German troop morale was higher than the year before.

==== Battle of Hill 70 ====
Attacks to threaten Lens and Lille were to be made by the First Army in late June near Gavrelle and Oppy, along the Souchez river. The objective was to eliminate a German salient between Avion and the west end of Lens, by taking reservoir Hill (Hill 65) and Hill 70. The attacks were conducted earlier than planned to use heavy and siege artillery before it was transferred to Ypres, the Souchez operation being cut back and the attack on Hill 70 postponed. The Battle of Hill 70, 30 mi (48 km) south of Ypres, eventually took place from 15 to 25 August. The Canadian Corps fought four divisions of the German 6th Army in the operation. The capture of Hill 70 was a costly success in which three Canadian divisions inflicted many casualties on the German divisions opposite and pinned down troops reserved for the relief of tired divisions in Flanders. Hermann von Kuhl, chief of staff of Army Group Crown Prince Rupprecht, wrote later that it was a costly defeat and wrecked the plan for relieving fought-out (exhausted) divisions in Flanders.

==== Battle of Langemarck ====
The Battle of Langemarck was fought from 16 to 18 August; the Fifth Army headquarters was influenced by the effect that delay would have on Operation Hush, which needed the high tides due at the end of August or it would have to be postponed for a month. Gough intended that the rest of the green line, just beyond the Wilhelmstellung (German third line), from Polygon Wood to Langemarck, was to be captured and the Steenbeek crossed further north. In the II Corps area, the disappointment of 10 August was repeated, with the infantry managing to advance, then being isolated by German artillery and forced back to their start line by German counter-attacks, except in the 25th Division area near Westhoek. Attempts by the German infantry to advance further were stopped by British artillery-fire with many casualties. The advance further north in the XVIII Corps area retook and held the north end of St Julien and the area south-east of Langemarck, while XIV Corps captured Langemarck and the Wilhelmstellung north of the Ypres–Staden railway, near the Kortebeek stream. The French First Army conformed, pushing up to the Kortebeek and St Jansbeck stream west of the northern stretch of the Wilhelmstellung, where it crossed to the east side of the Kortebeek.

==== Local attacks ====
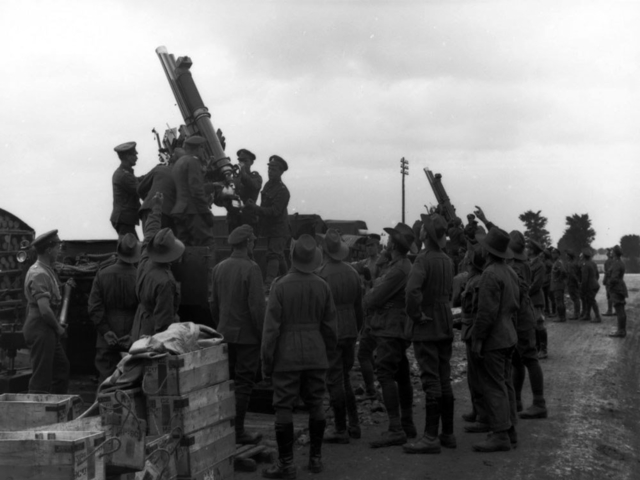
British anti-aircraft gun at Morbecque, 29 August 1917

The Germans continued to inflict losses on the British divisions beyond Langemarck but on 19 August, after two fine dry days, XVIII Corps conducted a novel combined arms operation with infantry, tanks, aircraft and artillery. German strongpoints and pillboxes along the St Julien–Poelcappelle road in front of the Wilhelmstellung were captured. On 22 August, more ground was gained by XIX and XVIII corps but the Germans on the Gheluvelt Plateau remained. Another attack by II Corps on the Gheluvelt Plateau (22 to 24 August) failed in fighting that was costly to both sides.

Gough laid down a new infantry formation of skirmish lines to be followed by "worms" on 24 August and Cavan noted that pillboxes should be attacked on a broad front to engage them simultaneously. Another general offensive, intended for 25 August, was delayed by the failure of the preliminary attacks and then postponed due to more bad weather. On 27 August, II Corps tried a combined tank and infantry attack but the tanks bogged, the attack failed and Haig called a halt to operations until the weather improved.

==== Weather ====
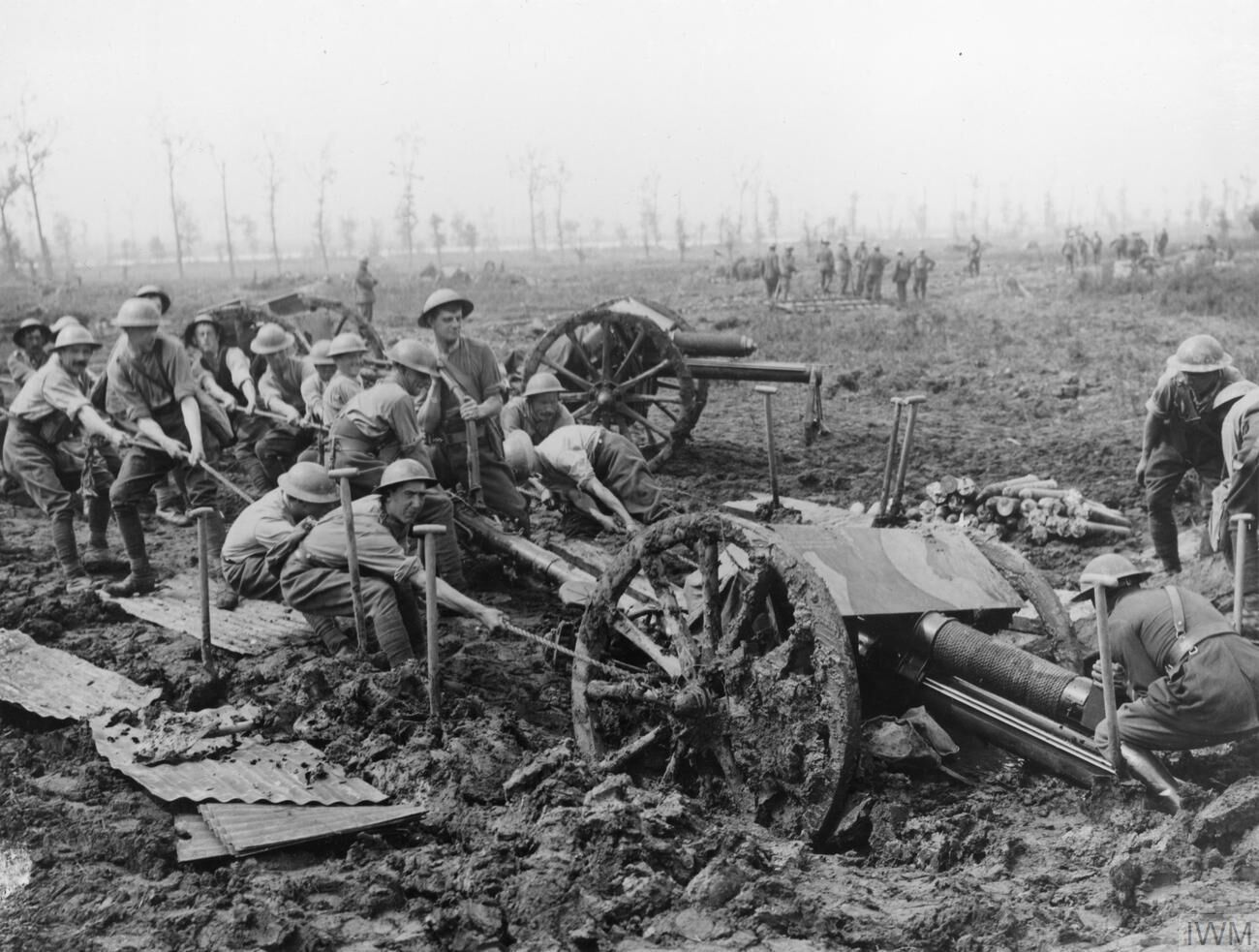
Royal Field Artillery gunners hauling an 18-pounder field gun out of the mud near Zillebeke, 9 August 1917

In Field Marshal Earl Haig (1929), Brigadier-General John Charteris, the BEF Chief of Intelligence from 1915 to 1918, wrote that

Careful investigation of records of more than eighty years showed that in Flanders the weather broke early each August with the regularity of the Indian monsoon: once the Autumn rains set in difficulties would be greatly enhanced....Unfortunately, there now set in the wettest August for thirty years.

— Charteris

only the first part of which was quoted by Lloyd George (1934), Liddell Hart (1934) and Leon Wolff (1959). In a 1997 essay, John Hussey called the passage by Charteris "baffling". The BEF had set up a Meteorological Section under Ernest Gold in 1915, which by the end of 1917 had 16 officers and 82 men. The section predicted the warm weather and thunderstorms of 7 to 14 June; in a letter to the press of 17 January 1958, Gold wrote that the facts of the Flanders climate contradicted Charteris. In 1989, Philip Griffiths examined August weather in Flanders for the thirty years before 1916 and found that,

...there is no reason to suggest that the weather broke early in the month with any regularity.

— Griffiths

From 1901 to 1916, records from a weather station at Cap Gris Nez showed that 65 per cent of August days were dry and that from 1913 to 1916, there were 26, 23, 23 and 21 rainless days and monthly rainfall of 17, 28, 22 and 96 mm (0.67, 1.10, 0.87 and 3.78 in);

...during the summers preceding the Flanders campaign August days were more often dry than wet.

— Griffiths

There were 127 mm (5.0 in) of rain in August 1917 and 84 mm (3.3 in) of the total fell on 1, 8, 14, 26 and 27 August. The month was overcast and windless, which much reduced evaporation. Divided into two ten-day and an eleven-day period, there were 53.6, 32.4 and 41.3 mm (2.11, 1.28 and 1.63 in) of rain; in the 61 hours before 6:00 p.m. on 31 July, 12.5 mm (0.49 in) fell. From 6:00 p.m. on 31 July to 6:00 p.m. on 4 August, there was another 63 mm (2.5 in) of rain. August 1917 had three dry days and 14 days with less than 1 mm (0.039 in) of rain. Three days were sunless and one had six minutes of sunshine; from 1 to 27 August there were 178.1 hours of sunshine, an average of 6.6 hours per day. Hussey wrote that the wet weather in August 1917 was exceptional and that Haig had been justified in expecting little rain and that it would be dried swiftly by sunshine and breezes.

==== Verdun ====
Petain had committed the French Second Army to an attack at Verdun in mid-July, in support of the Flanders offensive. The attack was delayed, partly due to mutinies in the French army after the failure of the Nivelle Offensive and because of a German attack at Verdun from 28 to 29 June, which captured some of the French jumping-off points. A French counter-attack on 17 July re-captured the ground, the Germans regained it on 1 August, then took ground on the east bank on 16 August. The French attacked on 20 August and by 9 September had taken 10,000 prisoners. Sporadic fighting continued into October, adding to the German difficulties on the Western Front and elsewhere. Ludendorff wrote

On the left bank, close to the Meuse, one division had failed ... and yet both here and in Flanders everything possible had been done to avoid failure ... The French army was once more capable of the offensive. It had quickly overcome its depression.

— Ludendorff: Memoirs

No German counter-attack was possible because the local Eingreif divisions had been transferred to Flanders.

=== September–October ===
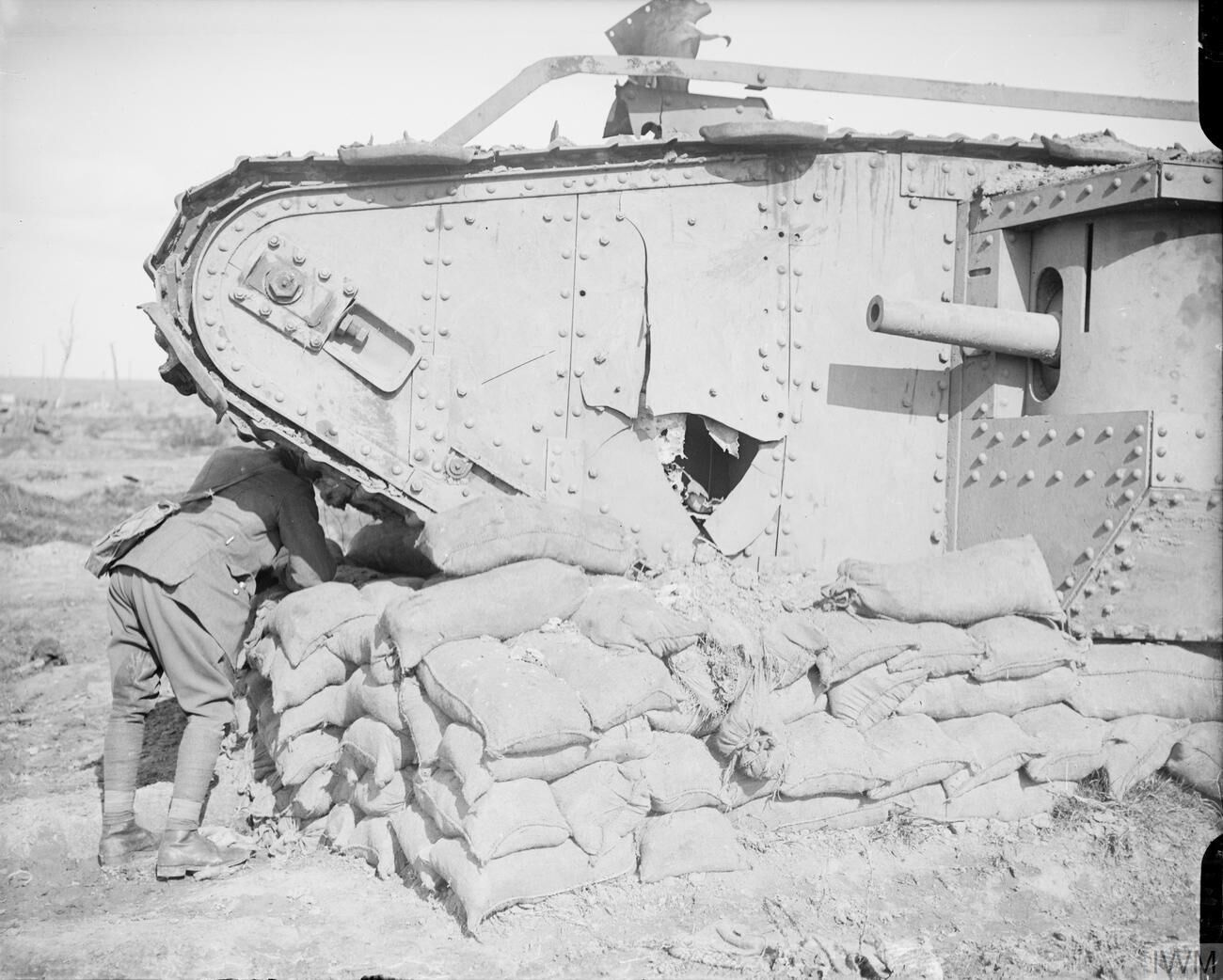
Derelict tank used as the roof of a dug out, Zillebeke, 20 September 1917 (Q6416)

The 4th Army had held on to the Gheluvelt Plateau in August but its casualties worsened the German manpower shortage. Haig transferred the main offensive effort to the Second Army on 25 August and moved the northern boundary of the Second Army closer to the Ypres–Roulers railway. More heavy artillery was sent to Flanders from the armies further south and placed opposite the Gheluvelt Plateau. Plumer continued the tactical evolution of the Fifth Army during its slow and costly progress in August. After a pause of about three weeks, Plumer intended to capture the plateau in four steps, with six-day intervals to bring forward artillery and supplies. The Second Army attacks were to remain limited and infantry brigade tactics were changed to attack the first objective with a battalion each and the final one with two battalions, the opposite of the Fifth Army practice on 31 July, to adapt to the dispersed defences being encountered between the Albrechtstellung and the Wilhelmstellung.

Plumer arranged for the medium and heavy artillery reinforcements reaching Flanders to be added to the creeping bombardment, which had been impossible with the amount of artillery available to the Fifth Army. The tactical changes ensured that more infantry attacked on narrower fronts, to a shallower depth than on 31 July, like the Fifth Army attacks in August. The shorter and quicker advances possible once the ground dried were intended to be consolidated on tactically advantageous ground, especially on any reverse slopes in the area, with the infantry still in contact with the artillery and aircraft, ready to repulse counter-attacks. The faster tempo of operations was intended to add to German difficulties in replacing tired divisions through the railway bottlenecks behind the German front. The pause in British attacks misled some of the German commanders and Albrecht von Thaer, the chief of staff of Gruppe Wijtschate, wrote that it was "almost boring". Kuhl doubted that the offensive had ended but had changed his mind by 13 September; two divisions, thirteen heavy artillery batteries, twelve field batteries, three fighter squadrons and four other units of the Luftstreitkräfte were transferred from the 4th Army.

==== German tactical changes ====
After setting objectives 1–2 mi (1.6–3.2 km) distant on 31 July, the British attempted shorter advances of approximately 1,500 yd (1,400 m) in August but were unable to achieve these lesser objectives in the south of the battlefield, because the rain soaked ground and poor visibility were to the advantage of the defenders. After the dry spell in early September, British advances had been much quicker and the final objective was reached a few hours after dawn, which confounded the German counter-attack divisions. Having crossed 2 mi (3.2 km) of mud, the Eingreif divisions found the British already dug in, with the German forward battle zone and its weak garrison gone beyond recapture. In August, German front-line divisions had two regiments deployed in the front line, with the third regiment in reserve. The front battalions had needed to be relieved much more frequently than expected due to the power of British attacks, constant artillery-fire and the weather. Replacement units became mixed up with ones holding the front and reserve regiments had failed to intervene quickly, leaving front battalions unsupported until Eingreif divisions arrived some hours later.

In July and August, German counter-attack (Eingreif) divisions had conducted an "advance to contact during mobile operations", which had given the Germans several costly defensive successes. After the Battle of the Menin Road Ridge, German tactics were changed. After another defeat on 26 September, the German commanders made more tactical changes to counter the more conservative form of limited attacks adopted by the British. German counter-attacks in September had been "assaults on reinforced field positions", due to the restrained nature of British infantry advances. The fine weather in early September had greatly eased British supply difficulties, especially in ammunition and the British made time to establish a defence in depth on captured ground, protected by standing artillery barrages. The British attacked in dry, clear conditions, with more aircraft over the battlefield for counter-attack reconnaissance. It had also been found in 1916 that corps headquarters had become aware of the situation from the reports of aircrew on contact-patrol, where reconnaissance aircraft flew low over the battlefield to map the positions of British troops. Brigade headquarters had been ignorant of events and arrangements were made for the swift transmission of information forwards. Systematic defensive artillery-fire was forfeited by the Germans, due to uncertainty over the position of their infantry, just when the British infantry benefited from the opposite. German counter-attacks were costly failures and on 28 September, Thaer wrote that the experience was "awful" and that he did not know what to do.

Ludendorff ordered the Stellungsdivisionen (ground holding divisions) to reinforce their front garrisons; all machine-guns, including those of the support and reserve battalions were sent into the forward zone, to form a cordon of four to eight guns every 250 yd (230 m). The Stellungsdivisionen were reinforced by the Stoß (shock) regiments of Eingreif divisions, which were moved into the artillery protective line behind the forward battle zone, to counter-attack sooner. The other regiments of the Eingreif divisions were to be held back and used for a methodical counter-attack (Gegenangriff) a day or two after and for spoiling attacks as the British reorganised. (Note: The 4th Guard Division, 4th Bavarian Division, 6th Bavarian Division, 10th Ersatz Division, 16th Division, 19th Reserve Division, 20th Division, 187th Division, 195th Division and 45th Reserve Division took part in the battle.) More tactical changes were ordered on 30 September; operations to increase British infantry losses were to continue and gas bombardments were to be increased, weather permitting. Every effort was to be made to induce the British to reinforce their forward positions with infantry for the German artillery to bombard them. Between 26 September and 3 October, the Germans attacked at least 24 times and Operation High Storm Unternehmen Hohensturm, a Gegenangriff (methodical counter-attack), to recapture the area around Zonnebeke was planned for 4 October.

==== Battle of the Menin Road Ridge ====
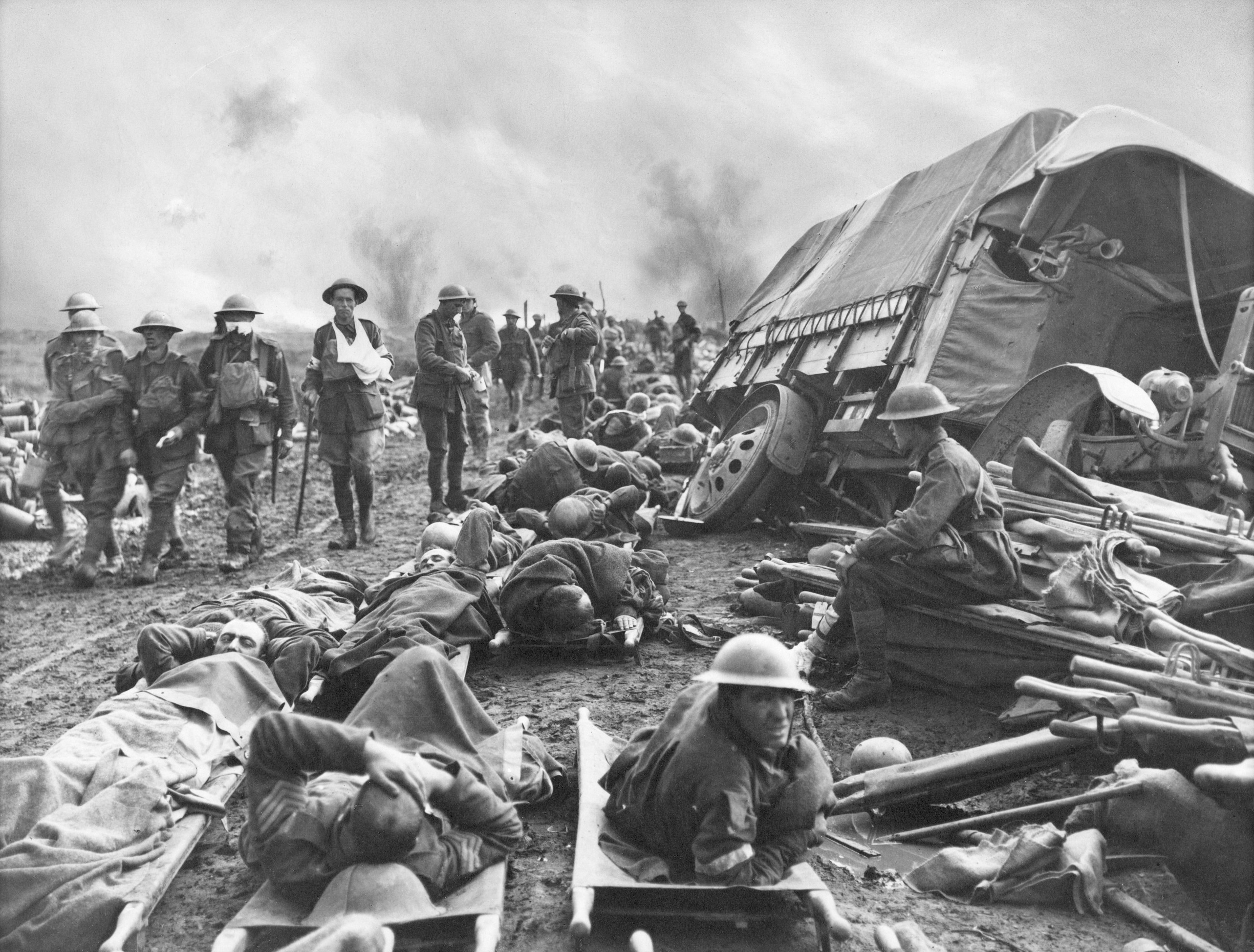
Wounded men at the side of a road after the Battle of Menin Road

The British plan for the battle fought from 20 to 25 September, included more emphasis on the use of heavy and medium artillery to destroy German concrete pill-boxes and machine-gun nests, which were more numerous in the battle zones being attacked, than behind the original July front line and to engage in more counter-battery fire. The British had 575 heavy and medium and 720 field guns and howitzers, more than double the quantity of artillery available at the Battle of Pilckem Ridge. Aircraft were to be used for systematic air observation of German troop movements, to avoid the failures of previous battles, where too few aircrews had been burdened with too many duties and had flown in bad weather, which made their difficulties worse.

On 20 September, the Allies attacked on a 14,500 yd (8.2 mi; 13.3 km) front and by mid-morning had captured most of their objectives, to a depth of about 1,500 yd (1,400 m). The Germans made many hasty counter-attacks (Gegenstoße), beginning around 3:00 p.m. until early evening, all of which failed to gain ground or made only a temporary penetration of the new British positions. The German defence had failed to stop a well-prepared attack made in good weather. Minor attacks took place after 20 September, as both sides jockeyed for position and reorganised their defences. A mutually-costly attack by the Germans on 25 September, recaptured pillboxes at the south western end of Polygon Wood. Next day, the German positions near the wood were swept away in the Battle of Polygon Wood.

==== German counter-attack, 25 September ====
Two regiments of the German 50th Reserve Division attacked on a 1,800 yd (1,600 m) front, either side of the Reutelbeek stream, supported by aircraft and 44 field and 20 heavy batteries of artillery, four times the usual amount for a division. The German infantry managed to advance on the flanks, about 100 yd (91 m) near the Menin road and 600 yd (550 m) north of the Reutelbeek. The infantry were supported by artillery-observation and ground-attack aircraft; a box-barrage was fired behind the British front-line, which isolated the British infantry from reinforcements and ammunition. Return-fire from the 33rd Division and the 15th Australian Brigade of the 5th Australian Division along the southern edge of Polygon Wood to the north, forced the attackers under cover around some of the Wilhelmstellung pillboxes, near Black Watch Corner, at the south-western edge of Polygon Wood. German attempts to reinforce the attacking troops failed, due to British artillery observers isolating the advanced German troops with artillery barrages.

Plumer ordered the attack due on 26 September to go ahead but reduced the objectives of the 33rd Division. The 98th Brigade was to advance and cover the right flank of the 5th Australian Division and the 100th Brigade was to re-capture the lost ground further south. The 5th Australian Division advance the next day began with uncertainty as to the security of its right flank; the attack of the depleted 98th Brigade was delayed and only managed to reach Black Watch Corner, 1,000 yd (910 m) short of its objectives. Reinforcements moved into the 5th Australian Division area and attacked south-westwards at noon as a silent (without artillery support) frontal attack was made from Black Watch Corner, because British troops were known to be holding out in the area. The attack succeeded by 2:00 p.m. and later in the afternoon, the 100th Brigade re-took the ground lost north of the Menin road. Casualties in the 33rd Division were so great that it was relieved on 27 September by the 23rd Division, which had only been withdrawn on the night of 24/25 September.

==== Battle of Polygon Wood ====
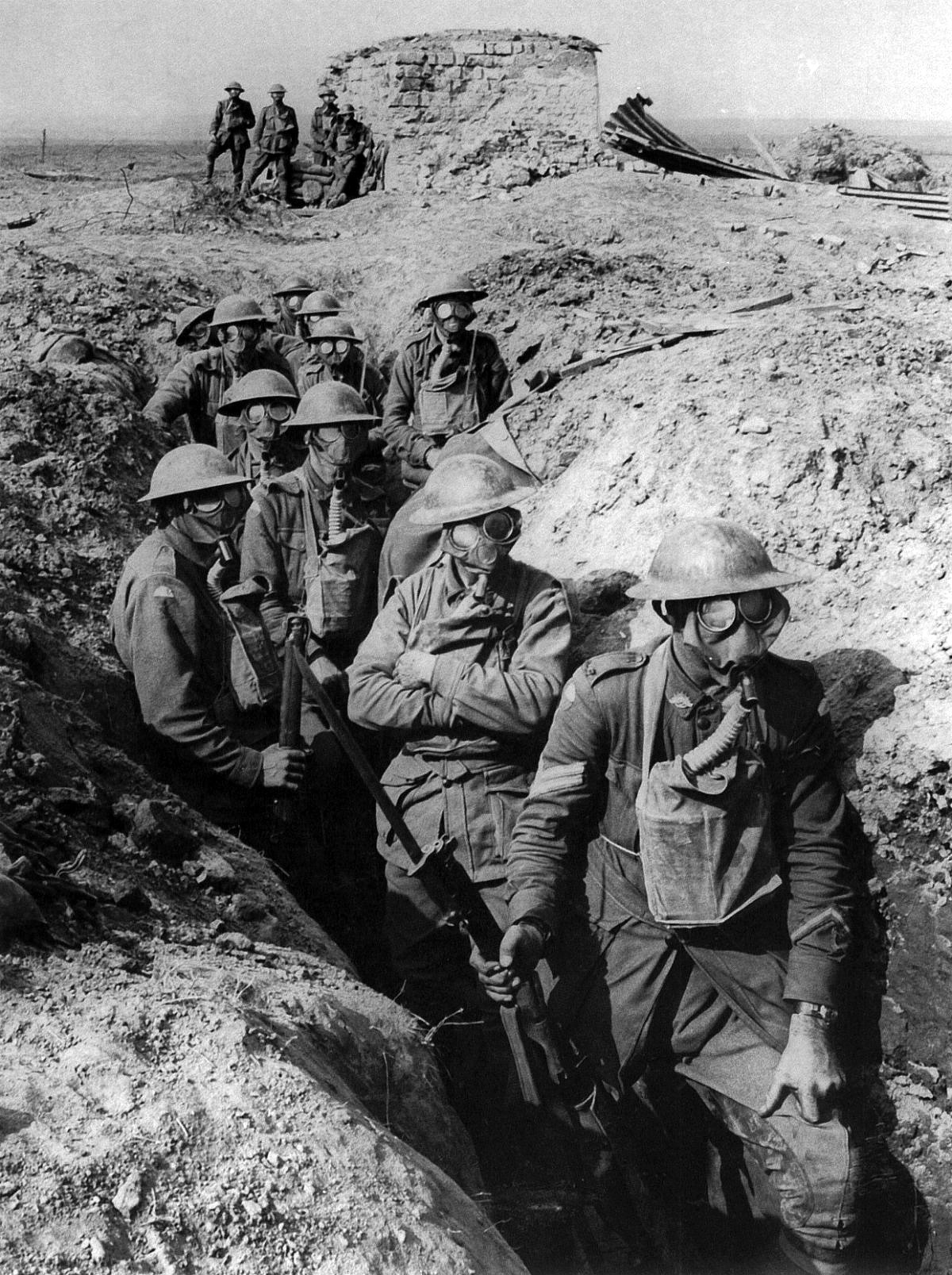
Australian infantry with small box respirator gas masks, Ypres, September 1917

The Second Army altered its Corps frontages soon after the attack of 20 September, for the next effort (26 September – 3 October) so that each attacking division could be concentrated on a 1,000 yd (910 m) front. Roads and light railways were extended to the new front line, to allow artillery and ammunition to be moved forward. The artillery of VIII Corps and IX Corps on the southern flank, simulated preparations for attacks on Zandvoorde and Warneton. At 5.50 a.m. on 26 September, five layers of barrage fired by British artillery and machine-guns began. Dust and smoke thickened the morning mist and the infantry advanced using compass bearings. Each of the three German ground-holding divisions attacked on 26 September had an Eingreif division in support, twice the ratio of 20 September. No ground captured by the British was lost and German counter-attacks managed only to reach ground to which survivors of the front-line divisions had retired.

=== October–November ===
==== German counter-attacks, 30 September – 4 October ====
At 4:00 a.m. on 30 September, a thick mist covered the ground and at 4:30 a.m. German artillery began a bombardment between the Menin road and the Reutelbeek. At 5:15 a.m., German troops emerged from the mist on an 800 yd (730 m) front. The attack was supported by flame-throwers and German infantry throwing smoke- and hand-grenades. The British replied with small-arms fire and bombs, forcing the Germans to retreat in confusion but a post was lost south of the Menin road, then retaken by an immediate counter-attack. SOS rockets were not seen in the mist and the British artillery remained silent. The Germans were repulsed again at 6:00 a.m. but German artillery-fire continued during the day.

On 1 October, at 5:00 a.m., a German hurricane bombardment began from the Reutelbeek north to Polygon Wood and Black Watch Corner; by coincidence a Second Army practice barrage began at 5:15 a.m. The British front line was cut off and German infantry attacked in three waves at 5:30 a.m. Two determined German attacks were repulsed south of Cameron Covert, then at 7:00 p.m. German troops massed near the Menin road. The German attack was defeated by small-arms fire and the British artillery, whose observers had seen the SOS rockets. The British were forced out of Cameron Covert and counter-attacked but a German attack began at the same time and the British were repulsed. Another German attack failed and the German troops dug in behind some old German barbed wire; after dark, more German attacks around Cameron Covert failed. North of the covert near Polygon Wood, deep mud smothered German shells before they exploded but they still caused many casualties. Communication with the rear was lost and the Germans attacked all day but British SOS rockets remained visible and the attacks took no ground; after dark German attacks were repulsed by another three SOS barrages.

Unternehmen Hohensturm (Operation High Storm) was planned by Gruppe Ypern to recapture the Tokio Spur from Zonnebeke south to Molenaarelsthoek at the eastern edge of Polygon Wood on 3 October. The attacking infantry from the 45th Reserve and the 4th Guard divisions were commanded by Major Kurt von Schleinitz in the north and Lieutenant-Colonel Rave in the south. After the costly failure of the methodical counter-attack (Gegenangriff) on 1 October, the attack was put back to 4 October, rehearsals taking place from 2 to 3 October. On the night of 3/4 October, the German commanders had doubts about the attack but decided to press on, warning the artillery to be ready to commence defensive bombardments. A contact patrol aircraft was arranged to fly over the area at 7:30 a.m.

==== Battle of Broodseinde ====
On 4 October, the British began the Battle of Broodseinde to complete the capture of the Gheluvelt Plateau and occupy Broodseinde Ridge. By coincidence, the Germans sought to recapture their defences around Zonnebeke with a Gegenangriff at the same time. The rains returned on the first day of the battle and became torrential by the time the British advanced. The British attacked along a 14,000 yd (8.0 mi; 13 km) front and as the I Anzac Corps divisions began their advance towards Broodseinde Ridge, men were seen rising from shell-holes in no man's land and more German troops were found concealed in shell-craters. Most of the German troops of the 45th Reserve Division were overrun or retreated through the British barrage, then the Australians attacked pillboxes one-by-one and captured the village of Zonnebeke north of the ridge. When the British barrage began on Broodseinde Ridge, the Keiberg Spur and Waterdamhoek, some of the German forward headquarters staffs only realised that they were under attack when British and Australian troops appeared.

As news arrived of the great success of the attack, the head of GHQ Intelligence went to the Second Army headquarters to discuss exploitation. Plumer declined the suggestion, as eight fresh German divisions were behind the battlefield, with another six beyond them. Later in the day, Plumer had second thoughts and ordered I Anzac Corps to push on to the Keiberg spur, with support from the II Anzac Corps. The II Anzac Corps commander wanted to advance north-east towards Passchendaele village but the I Anzac Corps commander preferred to wait until artillery had been brought up and supply routes improved. The X Corps commander proposed an attack northward from In de Ster into the southern flank of the Germans opposite I Anzac Corps. The 7th Division commander objected, due to uncertainty about the situation and the many casualties suffered by the 21st Division on the right flank and Plumer changed his mind again. During the morning, Gough had told the Fifth Army corps commanders to push on but when reports arrived of a repulse at 19 Metre Hill, the order was cancelled.

==== German tactical changes ====
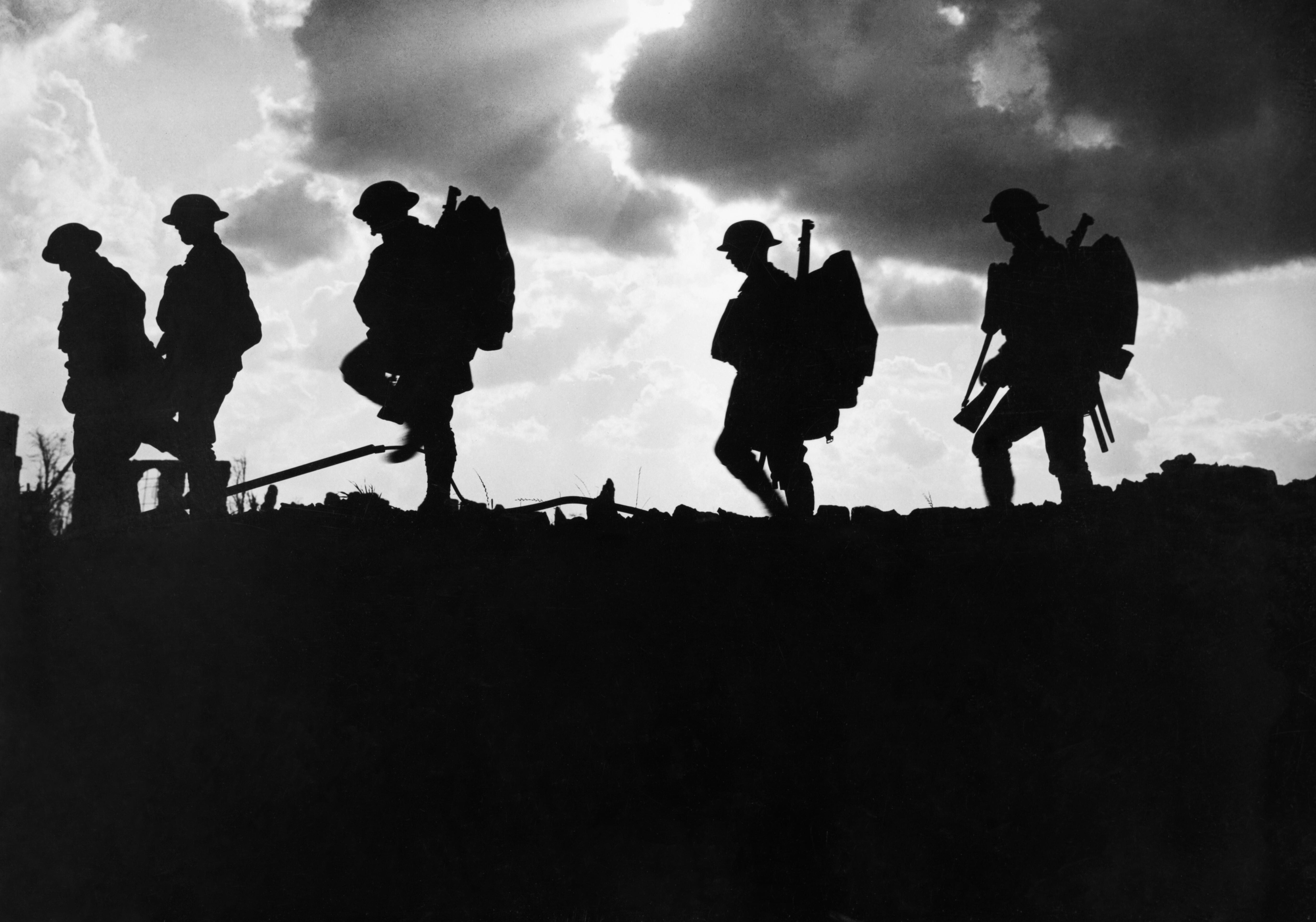
British soldiers moving forward during the Battle of Broodseinde. Photo by Ernest Brooks.

On 7 October, the 4th Army again dispersed its troops in the front defence zone. Reserve battalions moved back behind the artillery protective line and the Eingreif divisions were organised to intervene as swiftly as possible once an attack commenced, despite the risk from British artillery-fire. Counter-battery fire to suppress the British artillery was to be increased, to protect the Eingreif divisions as they advanced. All of the German divisions holding front zones were relieved and an extra division brought forward, because the British advances had lengthened the front line. Without the divisions necessary for a counter-offensive south of the Gheluvelt Plateau towards Kemmel Hill, Rupprecht began to plan for a slow withdrawal from the Ypres Salient, even at the risk of uncovering German positions further north and on the Belgian coast. (Note: 195th, 16th, 4th Bavarian, 18th, 227th, 240th, 187th and 22nd Reserve divisions).)

==== Battle of Poelcappelle ====
The French First Army and British Second and Fifth armies attacked on 9 October, on a 13,500 yd (7.7 mi; 12.3 km) front, from south of Broodseinde to St Jansbeek, to advance half of the distance from Broodseinde ridge to Passchendaele, on the main front, which led to many casualties on both sides. Advances in the north of the attack front were retained by British and French troops but most of the ground taken in front of Passchendaele and on the Becelaere and Gheluvelt spurs was lost to German counter-attacks. General William Birdwood later wrote that the return of heavy rain and mud sloughs was the main cause of the failure to hold captured ground. Kuhl concluded that the fighting strained German fighting power to the limit but that the German forces managed to prevent a breakthrough, although it was becoming much harder to replace losses.

==== First Battle of Passchendaele ====
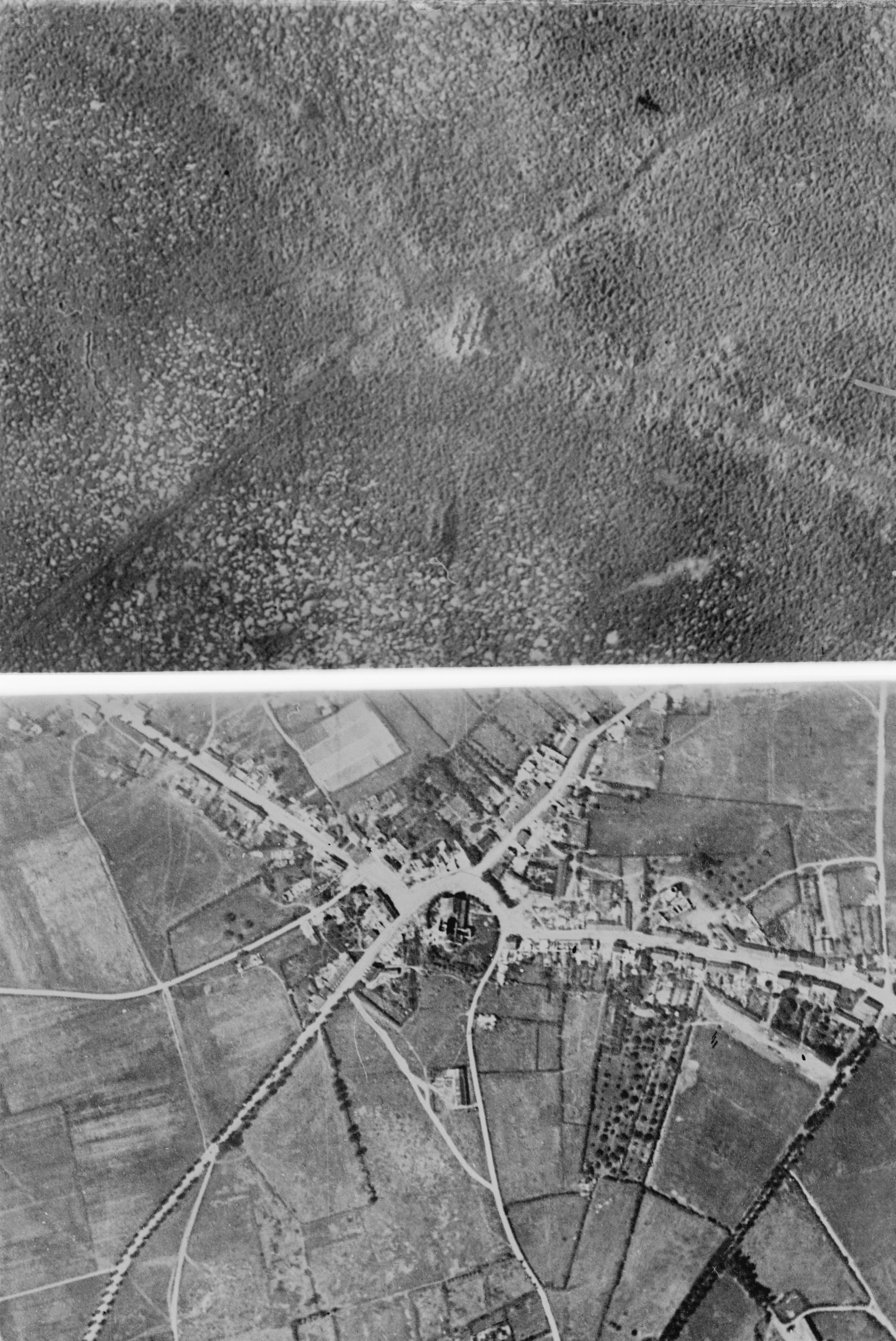
Aerial view of Passchendaele village before and after the battle

The First Battle of Passchendaele on 12 October 1917 was another Allied attempt to gain ground around Passchendaele. Heavy rain and mud again made movement difficult and little artillery could be brought closer to the front. Allied troops were exhausted and morale had fallen. After a modest British advance, German counter-attacks recovered most of the ground lost opposite Passchendaele, except for an area on the right of the Wallemolen spur. North of Poelcappelle, the XIV Corps of the Fifth Army advanced along the Broembeek some way up the Watervlietbeek and the Stadenrevebeek streams and the Guards Division captured the west end of the Vijwegen spur, gaining observation over the south end of Houthulst Forest. There were 13,000 Allied casualties, including 2,735 New Zealanders, 845 of whom were dead or stranded in the mud of no-man's-land; it was one of the worst days in New Zealand military history.

At a conference on 13 October, Haig and the army commanders agreed that attacks would stop until the weather improved and roads could be extended, to carry more artillery and ammunition forward. The offensive was to continue, to reach a suitable line for the winter and to keep German attention on Flanders, with a French attack due on 23 October and the Third Army operation south of Arras scheduled for mid-November. The battle was also costly for the Germans, who lost more than 1,000 prisoners. The German 195th Division at Passchendaele suffered 3,325 casualties from 9 to 12 October and had to be relieved by the 238th Division. Ludendorff became optimistic that Passchendaele Ridge could be held and ordered the 4th Army to stand fast. On 18 October, Kuhl advocated a retreat as far to the east as possible; Sixt von Armin and Loßberg wanted to hold on, because the ground beyond the Passchendaele watershed was untenable, even in winter.

==== Action of 22 October ====
On 22 October the 18th (Eastern) Division of XVIII Corps attacked the east end of Poelcappelle as XIV Corps to the north attacked with the 34th Division between the Watervlietbeek and Broenbeek streams and the 35th Division northwards into Houthulst Forest. The attack was supported by a regiment of the French 1st Division on the left flank of the 35th Division and was intended to obstruct a possible German counter-attack on the left flank of the Canadian Corps as it attacked Passchendaele and the ridge. The artillery of the Second and Fifth armies conducted a bombardment to simulate a general attack as a deception. Poelcappelle was captured but the attack at the junction between the 34th and 35th divisions was repulsed. German counter-attacks pushed back the 35th Division in the centre but the French attack captured all its objectives. Attacking on ground cut up by bombardments and soaked by rain, the British had struggled to advance in places and lost the ability to move quickly to outflank pillboxes. The 35th Division reached the fringe of Houthulst Forest but was outflanked and pushed back in places. German counter-attacks made after 22 October, were at an equal disadvantage and were costly failures. The German 4th Army was prevented from transferring troops away from the Fifth Army and from concentrating its artillery-fire on the Canadians as they prepared for the Second Battle of Passchendaele (26 October – 10 November 1917).

==== Battle of La Malmaison ====
After numerous requests from Haig, Petain began the Battle of La Malmaison, a long-delayed French attack on the Chemin des Dames, by the Sixth Army (General Paul Maistre). The artillery preparation started on 17 October and on 23 October, the German defenders were swiftly defeated and the French advanced up to 3.7 mi (6.0 km), capturing the village and old fort of La Malmaison, gaining control of the Chemin des Dames ridge. The Germans lost 38,000 men killed or missing and 12,000 prisoners, along with 200 guns and 720 machine-guns, against 14,000 French casualties, fewer than a third of the German total. The Germans had to withdraw from their remaining positions on the Chemin des Dames to the north side of the Ailette Valley early in November. Haig was pleased with the French success but regretted the delay, which had lessened its effect on the Flanders operations.

==== Second Battle of Passchendaele ====
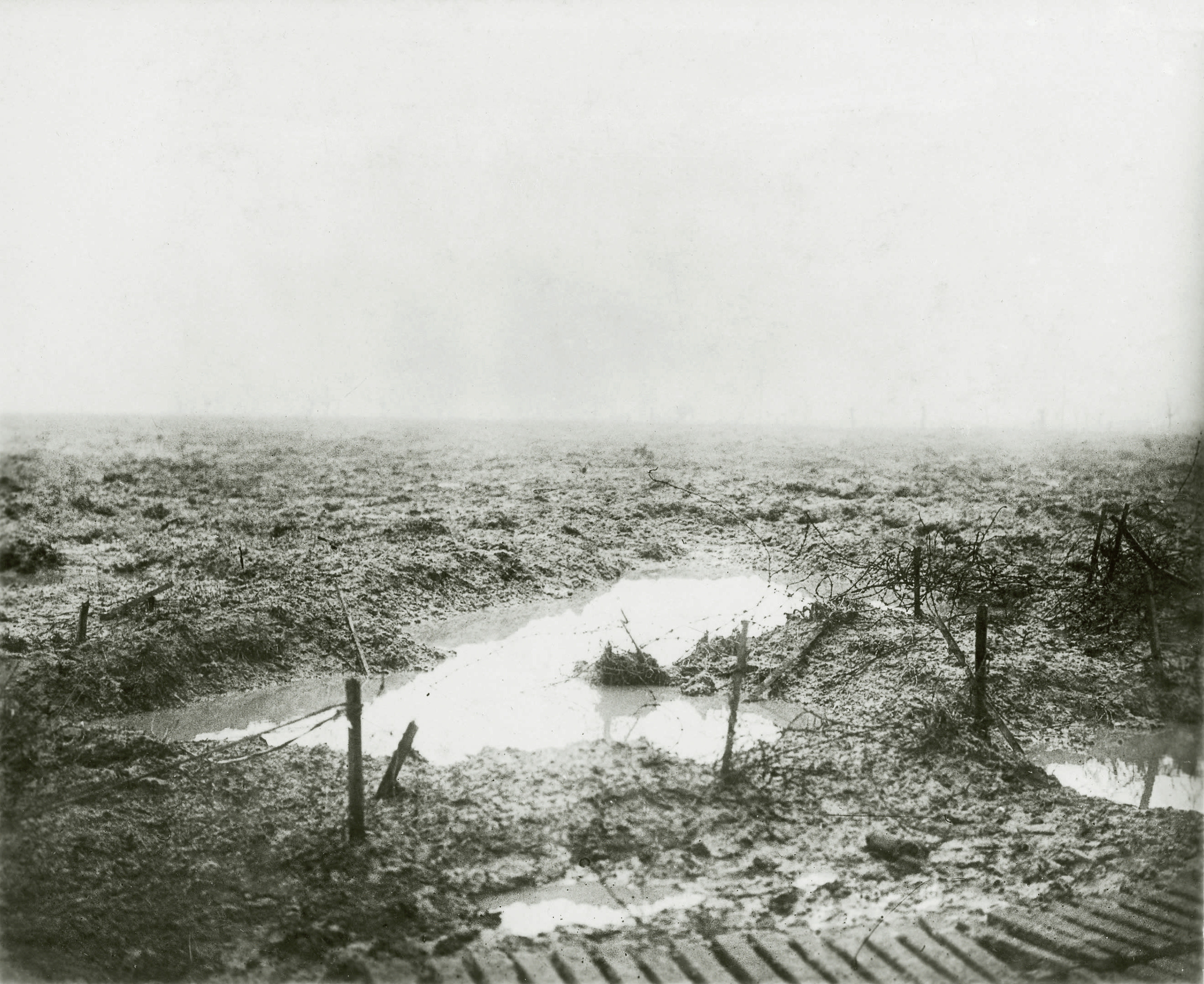
Terrain through which the Canadian Corps advanced at Passchendaele, in late 1917

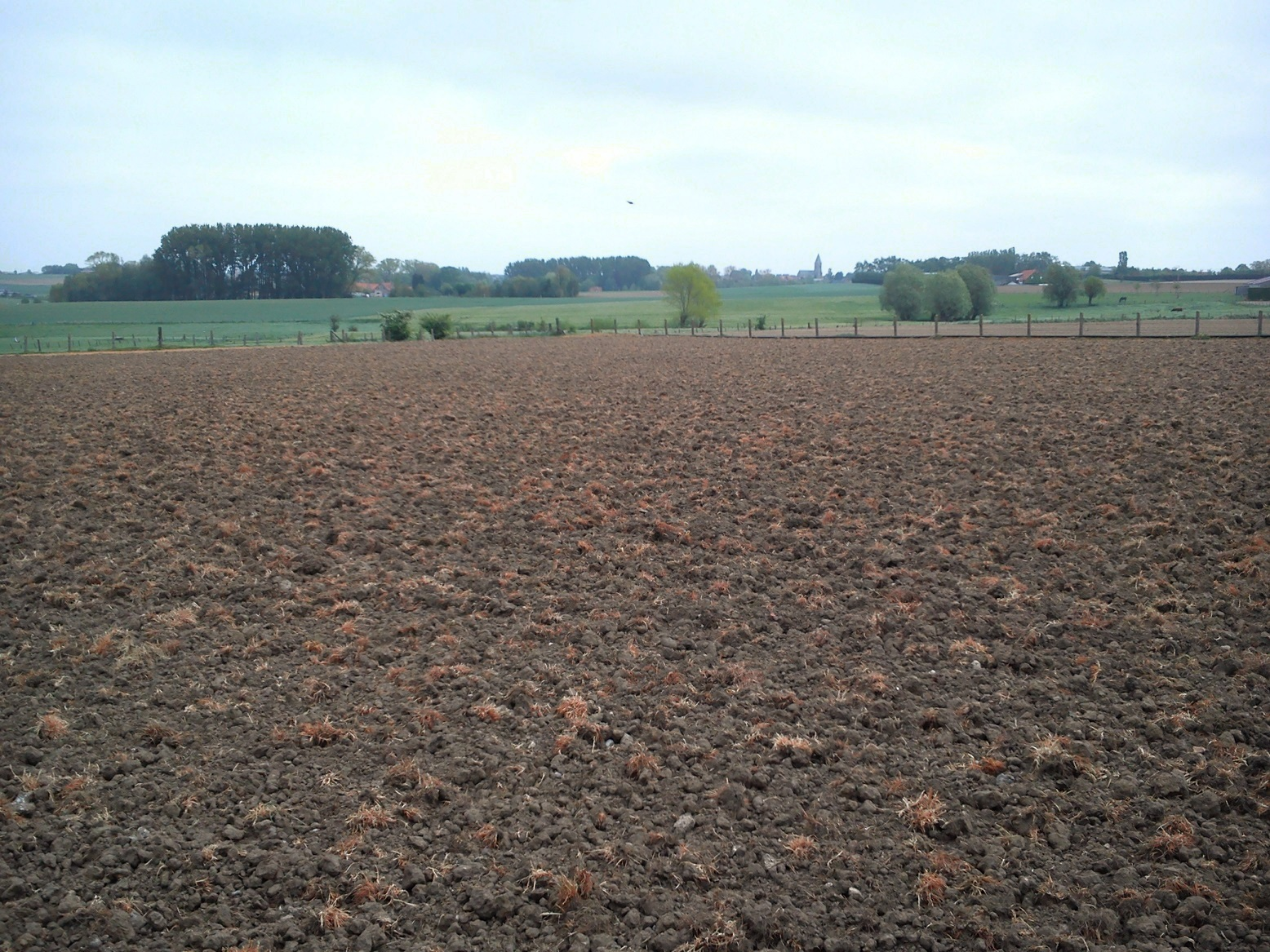
Terrain at Passchendaele near where the Canadian Corps advanced, spring 2015

The British Fifth Army undertook minor operations from 20 to 22 October, to maintain pressure on the Germans and support the French attack at La Malmaison, while the Canadian Corps prepared for a series of attacks from 26 October to 10 November. The four divisions of the Canadian Corps had been transferred to the Ypres Salient from Lens, to capture Passchendaele and the ridge. The Canadians relieved the II Anzac Corps on 18 October and found that the front line was mostly the same as that occupied by the 1st Canadian Division back in April 1915.

The Canadian operation was to be three limited attacks, on 26 October, 30 October and 6 November. On 26 October, the 3rd Canadian Division captured its objective at Wolf Copse, then swung back its northern flank to link with the adjacent division of the Fifth Army. The 4th Canadian Division captured its objectives but was forced slowly to retire from Decline Copse by German counter-attacks and communication failures between the Canadians and the Australian units to the south.

The second stage began on 30 October, to complete the previous stage and gain a base for the final assault on Passchendaele. The attackers on the southern flank quickly captured Crest Farm and sent patrols beyond the final objective into Passchendaele. The attack on the northern flank again met with exceptional German resistance. The 3rd Canadian Division captured Vapour Farm on the corps boundary, Furst Farm to the west of Meetcheele and the crossroads at Meetcheele but remained short of its objective.

During a seven-day pause, the Second Army took over another section of the Fifth Army front adjoining the Canadian Corps. Three rainless days from 3 to 5 November eased preparation for the next stage, which began on the morning of 6 November, with the 1st Canadian Division and the 2nd Canadian Division. In less than three hours, many units reached their final objectives and Passchendaele was captured. The Canadian Corps attacked on 10 November to gain control of the remaining high ground north of the village near Hill 52. (Note: German troops engaged were from the 239th, 39th, 4th, 44th Reserve, 7th, 11th, 11th Bavarian, 238th, 199th, 27th, 185th, 111th and 40th divisions.)

=== December ===
==== Night action of 1/2 December 1917 ====
The 8th Division on Passchendaele ridge, December 1917

On 18 November the VIII Corps on the right and II Corps on the left (northern) side of the Passchendaele Salient took over from the Canadian Corps. The area was subjected to constant German artillery bombardments and its vulnerability to attack led to a suggestion by Brigadier C. F. Aspinall, that either the British should retire to the west side of the Gheluvelt Plateau or advance to broaden the salient towards Westroosebeke. Expanding the salient would make the troops in it less vulnerable to German artillery-fire and provide a better jumping off line for a resumption of the offensive in the spring of 1918. The British attacked towards Westroozebeke on the night of 1/2 December but the plan to mislead the Germans, by not bombarding the German defences until eight minutes after the infantry advanced, came undone. The noise of the British assembly and the difficulty of moving across muddy and waterlogged ground had also alerted the Germans. In the moonlight, the Germans could see the British troops when they were still 200 yd (180 m) away. Some ground was captured and about 150 prisoners were taken but the attack on the redoubts failed and observation over the heads of the valleys on the east and north sides of the ridge was not achieved.

==== Action on the Polderhoek Spur ====
The attack on the Polderhoek Spur on 3 December 1917, was a local operation by the British Fourth Army (renamed from the Second Army on 8 November). Two battalions of the 2nd New Zealand Brigade of the New Zealand Division attacked the low ridge, from which German observers could view the area from Cameron Covert to the north and the Menin road to the south-west. A New Zealand advance of 600 yd (550 m) on a 400 yd (370 m) front, would shield the area north of the Reutelbeek stream from German observers on the Gheluvelt spur. Heavy artillery bombarded the ruins of Polderhoek Château and the pillboxes in the grounds to mislead the defenders and the attack was made in daylight as a ruse to surprise the Germans, who would be under cover sheltering from the routine bombardments. Smoke and gas bombardments on the Gheluvelt and Becelaere spurs on the flanks and the infantry attack began at the same time as the "routine" bombardment. The ruse failed, some British artillery-fire dropped short on the New Zealanders and the Germans engaged the attackers with small-arms fire from Polderhoek Spur and Gheluvelt ridge. A strong west wind ruined the smoke screens and the British artillery failed to suppress the German machine-guns. New Zealand machine-gunners repulsed a counter-attack but the New Zealand infantry were 150 yd (140 m) short of the first objective; another attempt after dark was cancelled because of the full moon and the arrival of German reinforcements.

== Aftermath ==
=== Analysis ===
German casualties (Note: German casualties were counted in ten-day periods. A discrepancy of 27,000 fewer casualties recorded in the Sanitätsbericht could not be explained by the Reichsarchiv historians.)
Date	
21–31 July	30,000
1–10 Aug	16,000
11–21 Aug	24,000
21–31 Aug	12,500
1–10 Sept	4,000
11–20 Sept	25,000
21–30 Sept	13,500
1–10 Oct	35,000
11–20 Oct	12,000
21–31 Oct	20,500
1–10 Nov	9,500
11–20 Nov	4,000
21–30 Nov	4,500
1–10 Dec	4,000
11–31 Dec	2,500
Total	217,000

In a German General Staff publication, it was written that "Germany had been brought near to certain destruction (sicheren Untergang) by the Flanders battle of 1917". In his Memoirs of 1938, Lloyd George wrote, "Passchendaele was indeed one of the greatest disasters of the war ... No soldier of any intelligence now defends this senseless campaign ...". In 1939, G. C. Wynne wrote that the British had eventually reached Passchendaele Ridge and captured Flandern I Stellung but beyond them were Flandern II Stellung and Flandern III Stellung. The German submarine bases on the coast had not been captured but the objective of diverting the Germans from the French further south, while they recovered from the Nivelle Offensive in April, had succeeded. In 1997, Paddy Griffith wrote that the bite and hold system kept moving until November, because the BEF had developed a workable system of offensive tactics, against which the Germans ultimately had no answer. A decade later, Jack Sheldon wrote that relative casualty figures were irrelevant, because the German army could not afford the losses or to lose the initiative by being compelled to fight another defensive battle on ground of the Allies' choosing. The Third Battle of Ypres had pinned the German army to Flanders and caused unsustainable casualties.

In 2018, Jonathan Boff wrote that after the war the Reichsarchiv official historians, many of whom were former staff officers, wrote of the tactical changes after 26 September and their scrapping after the Battle of Broodseinde on 4 October, as the work of Loßberg. By blaming an individual, the rest of the German commanders were exculpated, which gave a false impression that OHL operated in a rational manner, when Ludendorff imposed another defensive scheme on 7 October. Boff wrote that this narrative was facile and that it avoided the problem faced by the Germans in late 1917. OHL had issued orders to change tactics again days before Loßberg was blamed for giving new orders to the 4th Army. Boff also doubted that all of the divisions in Flanders could act on top-down changes. The 119th Division was in the front line from 11 August to 18 October and replied that new tactics were difficult to implement due to lack of training. The tempo of British attacks and the effect of attrition meant that although six divisions were sent to the 4th Army by 10 October, they were either novice units deficient in training or veteran formations with low morale after earlier defeats; good divisions had been diluted with too many replacements. Boff wrote that the Germans consciously sought tactical changes for an operational dilemma for want of an alternative. On 2 October, Rupprecht had ordered the 4th Army HQ to avoid over-centralising command, only to find that Loßberg had issued an artillery plan detailing the deployment of individual batteries.

At a British conference on 13 October, the Third Army (General Julian Byng) scheme for an attack in mid-November was discussed. Byng wanted the operations at Ypres continued, to hold German troops in Flanders. The Battle of Cambrai began on 20 November and the British breached the first two parts of the Hindenburg Line, in the first successful mass use of tanks in a combined arms operation. The experience of the failure to contain the British attacks at Ypres and the drastic reduction in areas of the western front that could be considered "quiet" after the tank and artillery surprise at Cambrai, left the OHL with little choice but to return to a strategy of decisive victory in 1918. On 24 October, the Austro-German 14th Army (General der Infanterie Otto von Below), attacked the Italian Second Army on the Isonzo at the Battle of Caporetto and in 18 days, inflicted casualties of 650,000 men and 3,000 guns. In fear that Italy might be put out of the war, the French and British governments offered reinforcements. British and French troops were swiftly moved from 10 November to 12 December but the diversion of resources from the BEF forced Haig to conclude the Third Battle of Ypres short of Westrozebeke; the last substantial British attack took place on 10 November.

=== Casualties ===
Various casualty figures have been published for the Third Battle of Ypres, sometimes with acrimony; the highest estimates for British and German casualties appear to be discredited but the British claim to have taken 24,065 prisoners has not been disputed. In 1940, C. R. M. F. Cruttwell recorded 300,000 British casualties and 400,000 German. In the History of the Great War volume Military Operations.... published in 1948, James Edmonds put British casualties at 244,897 and wrote that equivalent German figures were not available, estimating German losses at 400,000. (Note: For British losses, Edmonds used data based on figures submitted by the Adjutant-General's Department to the Allied Supreme War Council on 25 February 1918; Edmonds also showed weekly returns to GHQ, giving a slightly lower total of 238,313. Edmonds wrote that whereas the true figure for British casualties on the Somme had been approximately 420,000, the Germans had announced that the British had suffered 600,000 casualties, which was close to what Edmonds believed to be the "true" number for German Somme casualties (582,919). The Bavarian Official History had put British casualties at the Third Battle of Ypres at 400,000, which Edmonds believed raised "suspicion" that this was the number of German casualties. Edmonds wrote that the German Official Account (Der Weltkrieg) put German 4th Army casualties (21 July – 31 December) at approximately 217,000. Edmonds considered that 30 per cent needed to be added to German figures, to make them comparable to British casualty recording criteria, which would amount to 289,000 casualties. Edmonds wrote that this did not include units which served only briefly in the 4th Army or units that were not part of it. Edmonds wrote that German divisions had an average strength of 12,000 men and tended to be relieved after suffering about 4,000 casualties. As Crown Prince Rupprecht recorded 88 German divisions fighting in the battle and after deducting 15,000 German casualties from 15 June to 30 July, the Germans must have suffered around 337,000 casualties. The average German battalion strength dropped to 640 men despite "allowing 100 men reinforcements per battalion", suggesting 364,320 casualties. Edmonds wrote "there seems every probability that the Germans lost about 400,000".) A. J. P. Taylor wrote in 1972 that no one believed Edmonds' "farcical calculations". Taylor put British wounded and killed at 300,000 and German losses at 200,000, "a proportion slightly better than the Somme".

In 2007, Jack Sheldon wrote that although German casualties from 1 June to 10 November were 217,194, a figure available in Volume III of the Sanitätsbericht (Medical Report, 1934), Edmonds may not have included these data as they did not fit his case, using the phrases "creative accounting" and "cavalier handling of the facts". Sheldon wrote that the German casualties could only be brought up to 399,590 by including the 182,396 soldiers who were sick or treated at regimental aid posts for "minor cuts and wounds" but not struck off unit strength; Sheldon wrote "it is hard to see any merit" in doing so.

Leon Wolff, writing in 1958, gave German casualties as 270,713 and British casualties as 448,688. Wolff's British figure was refuted by John Terraine in a 1977 publication. Despite writing that 448,614 British casualties was the BEF total for the second half of 1917, Wolff had neglected to deduct 75,681 casualties for the Battle of Cambrai, given in the Official Statistics from which he quoted or "normal wastage", averaging 35,000 per month in "quiet" periods. In 1959, Cyril Falls estimated 240,000 British, 8,525 French and 260,000 German casualties. In his 1963 biography of Haig, Terraine accepted Edmonds' figure of 244,897 British casualties and agreed that German losses were at least equal to and probably greater than British, owing to the strength of British artillery and the high number of German counterattacks; he did not accept Edmonds' calculation that German losses were as high as 400,000.

In his 1977 work, Terraine wrote that the German figure ought to be increased because their statistics were incomplete and because their data omitted some lightly wounded men, who would have been included under British casualty criteria, revising the German figure by twenty per cent, which made German casualties 260,400. Prior and Wilson, in 1997, gave British losses of 275,000 and German casualties at just under 200,000. In 1997, Heinz Hagenlücke gave c. 217,000 German casualties. Gary Sheffield wrote in 2002 that Richard Holmes guessed that both sides suffered 260,000 casualties, which seemed about right to him.

=== Subsequent operations ===
==== Winter 1917–1918 ====
The area to the east and south of the ruins of Passchendaele village was held by posts, those to the east being fairly habitable, unlike the southern ones; from Passchendaele as far back as Potijze, the ground was far worse. Each brigade spent four days in the front line, four in support and four in reserve. The area was quiet apart from artillery-fire and in December the weather turned cold and snowy, which entailed a great effort to prevent trench foot. In January, spells of freezing cold were followed by warmer periods, one beginning on 15 January with torrential rain and gale-force winds, washing away plank roads and duckboard tracks. Conditions in the salient improved with the completion of transport routes and the refurbishment of German pillboxes. Both sides raided and the British used night machine-gun fire and artillery barrages to great effect. On the evening of 3 March 1918, two companies of the 8th Division raided Teal Cottage, supported by a smoke and shrapnel barrage, killed many of the garrison and took six prisoners for one man wounded. A German attack on 11 March was repulsed; after that the Germans made no more attacks, keeping up frequent artillery bombardments and machine-gun fire instead. When the German armies further south began the Spring Offensive on 21 March 1918, "good" divisions in Flanders were sent south; the British withdrew the 29th Division on 9 April and transferred it to the Lys.

==== Retreat, 1918 ====
On 23 March, Haig ordered Plumer to make contingency plans to shorten the line and release troops for the other armies. Worn-out divisions from the south had been sent to Flanders to recuperate closer to the coast. On 11 April, Plumer authorised a withdrawal of the southern flank of the Second Army. On 12 April, the VIII Corps HQ ordered the infantry retirement to begin that night and the 59th (2nd North Midland) Division was replaced by part of the 41st Division and transferred south. The II Corps had begun to withdraw its artillery at the same time as VIII Corps, on the night of 11/12 April and ordered the 36th (Ulster) Division and 30th Division to conform to the VIII Corps retirement, which was complete by 13 April with no German interference. On 13 April, Plumer agreed to a retirement in the south side of the salient to a line from Mt Kemmel to Voormezeele [2.5 mi (4.0 km) south of Ypres], White Château [1 mi (1.6 km) east of Ypres] and Pilckem Ridge. The 4th Army diary recorded that the withdrawal was discovered at 4:40 a.m. Next day, at the Battle of Merckem, the Germans attacked from Houthulst Forest, north-east of Ypres and captured Kippe but were forced out by Belgian counter-attacks, supported by the II Corps artillery. On the afternoon of 27 April, the south end of the Second Army outpost line was driven in near Voormezeele and another British outpost line was established north-east of the village.

=== Commemoration ===
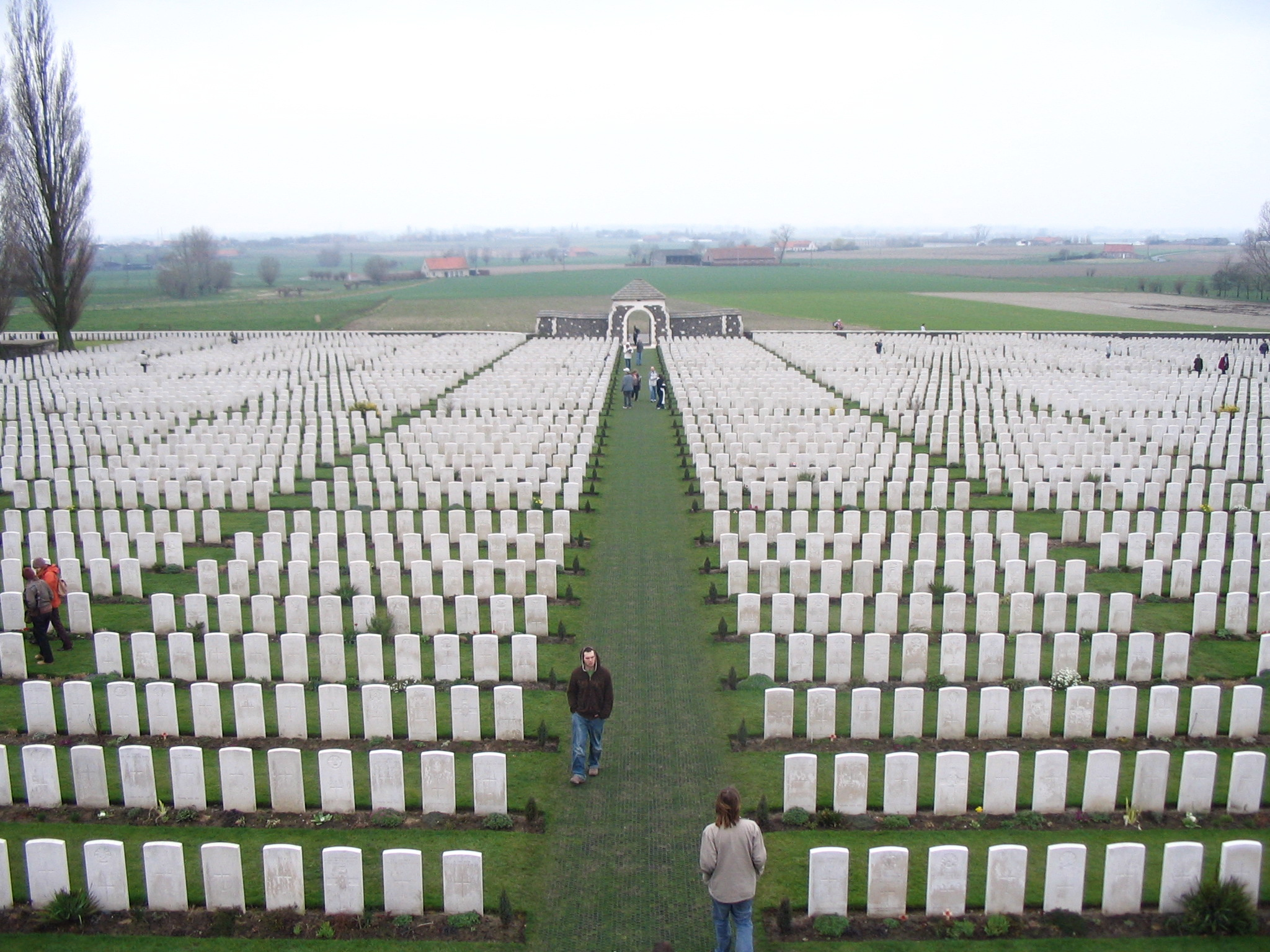
Tyne Cot Commonwealth War Graves Cemetery and Memorial to the Missing

The Menin Gate Memorial to the Missing commemorates those of all Commonwealth nations (except New Zealand and Newfoundland) who died in the Ypres Salient and have no known grave. In the case of the United Kingdom only casualties before 16 August 1917 are commemorated on the memorial. United Kingdom and New Zealand servicemen who died after that date are named on the memorial at Tyne Cot Cemetery. There is a New Zealand Memorial marking where New Zealand troops fought at Gravenstafel Ridge on 4 October, located on Roeselarestraat. There are numerous tributes and memorials in Australia and New Zealand to Anzac soldiers who died in the battle, including plaques at the Christchurch and Dunedin railway stations. The Canadian Corps' participation in the Second Battle of Passchendaele is commemorated with the Passchendaele Memorial at site of the Crest Farm on the south-west fringe of Passchendaele village.

One of the newest monuments to be dedicated to the fighting contribution of a group is the Celtic Cross memorial, commemorating the Scottish contribution to the fighting in Flanders during the Great War. This memorial is on Frezenberg Ridge where the 9th (Scottish) Division and the 15th (Scottish) Division fought during the Third Battle of Ypres. The monument was dedicated by Linda Fabiani, the Minister for Europe of the Scottish Parliament, during the late summer of 2007, the 90th anniversary of the battle. In July 2017 a two-day event was organised in Ypres to mark the centenary of the battle. Members of the British royal family and Prime Minister Theresa May joined the ceremonies, which started in the evening of 30 July with the service at Menin Gate, followed by ceremonies at the Market Square. On the following day, a ceremony was held at Tyne Cot cemetery, headed by the Prince of Wales.

== See also ==
- Passchendaele, a 2008 Canadian film with the battle as a backdrop.
