= Franco-Prussian War order of battle =

Combatants at the start of the war in 1870

This is an order of battle of the French and German Armies at the beginning of the Franco-Prussian War in 1870.

== France ==
Order of battle at the beginning of the war:

=== Army of the Rhine ===
Commander in Chief: Emperor Napoléon III
Chief of Staff: Marshal Edmond Le Bœuf

- Imperial Guard Corps (Garde impériale) : Gen. Charles Denis Bourbaki
  - 1st Infantry Division : Gen. Édouard-Jean-Étienne Deligny
    - 1st Brigade : Gen. Auguste Henri Brincourt
      - 1st Voltigeurs of the Guard
      - 2nd Voltigeurs of the Guard
      - Chasseurs of the Guard
    - 2nd Brigade : Gen. Garnier
      - 3rd Voltigueurs of the Guard
      - 4th Voltigueurs of the Guard
    - 1st Division Artillery : Lt. Col. Gerbaut
      - 2 Guard Foot batteries (4-pdr. guns)
      - 1 Guard Mitrailleuse battery
      - 3rd Engineer Regiment (1 company)
  - 2nd Infantry Division : Gen. Joseph Alexandre Picard
    - 1st Brigade : Gen. Pierre Joseph Jeanningros
      - Zouaves of the Guard
      - 1st Grenadiers of the Guard
    - 2nd Brigade : Gen. Le Poittetin de la Croix
      - 2nd Grenadiers of the Guard
      - 3rd Grenadiers of the Guard
    - 2nd Division Artillery : Lt. Col. de Cevilly
      - 2 Guard Foot Artillery batteries (4-pdr. guns)
      - 1 Guard Mitrailleuse battery
      - 3rd Engineer Regiment (1 company)
  - Cavalry Division : Gen. Desvaux
    - 1st Brigade : Gen. Halna du Fretay
      - Guides
      - Chasseurs of the Guard
    - 2nd Brigade : Gen. De France
      - Lancers of the Guard
      - Dragoons of the Guard
    - 3rd Brigade : Gen. du Preuil
      - Cuirassiers of the Guard
      - Carabiniers of the Guard
    - 2 Horse Artillery batteries (4-pdr. guns)
- 1st Corps (1er corps) : Marshal Patrice de MacMahon
  - 1st Infantry Division : Gen. Auguste-Alexandre Ducrot
    - 1st Brigade : Gen. Wolff
      - 18th Line Infantry Regiment
      - 96th Line Infantry Regiment
      - 13th Chasseur Battalion
    - 2nd Brigade : Gen. de Postis du Houlbec
      - 45th Line Infantry Regiment
      - 1st Regiment of Zouaves
    - 1st Division Artillery : Lt. Col. Lecoeutre
      - 2 Foot Artillery batteries (4-pdr. guns)
      - 1 Mitrailleuse battery
      - 1st Engineer Regiment (1 company)
  - 2nd Infantry Division : Gen. Abel Douay
    - 1st Brigade : Gen. Pelletier de Montmarie
      - 50th Line Infantry Regiment
      - 74th Line Infantry Regiment
      - 16th Chasseur Battalion
    - 2nd Brigade : Gen. Pelle
      - 78th Line Infantry Regiment
      - 1st Regiment of Turcos
    - 2nd Division Artillery : Lt. Col. Cauvet
      - 2 Foot Artillery batteries (4-pdr. guns)
      - 1 Mitrailleuse battery
      - 1st Engineer Regiment (1 company)
  - 3rd Infantry Division : Gen. Raoult
    - 1st Brigade : Gen. L'Heriller
      - 2nd Zouave Regiment
      - 36th Line Infantry Regiment
      - 8th Chasseur Battalion
    - 2nd Brigade : Gen. Lefebvre
      - 2nd Regiment of Turcos
      - 48th Line Infantry Regiment
    - 3rd Division Artillery : Lt. Col. Cheguillaume
      - 2 Foot Artillery batteries (4-pdr. guns)
      - 1 Mitrailleuse battery
      - 1st Engineer Regiment (1 company)
  - 4th Infantry Division : Gen. Lartigue
    - 1st Brigade : Gen. Fraboulet de Kerleade
      - 3rd Zouave Regiment
      - 56th Line Infantry Regiment
      - 1st Chasseur Battalion
    - 2nd Brigade : Gen. Charles Nicolas Lacretelle
      - 3rd Regiment of Turcos
      - 87th Line Infantry Regiment
    - 4th Division Artillery : Lt. Col. Lamande
      - 2 Foot Artillery batteries (4 pdr guns)
      - 1 Mitrailleuse battery
      - 1st Engineer Regiment (1 company)
  - Cavalry Division : Gen. Duhesme
    - 1st Brigade : Gen. de Septeuil
      - 3rd Hussar Regiment
      - 11th Chasseur Regiment
    - 2nd Brigade : Gen. de Nansouty
      - 2nd Lancer Regiment
      - 3rd Lancer Regiment
      - 10th Dragoon Regiment
    - 3rd Brigade : Gen. Michel
      - 8th Cuirassiers Regiment
      - 9th Cuirassiers Regiment
  - Reserve Artillery : Col. de Vassart
      - 2 Foot batteries (4-pdr. guns)
      - 2 Foot batteries (12-pdr. guns)
      - 4 Horse Artillery batteries
      - 1st Engineer Regiment (1 company)
- 2nd Corps (2e corps) : Gen. Charles Auguste Frossard
  - 1st Infantry Division : Gen. Verge
    - 1st Brigade : Gen. Letellier Valaze
      - 32nd Line Infantry Regiment
      - 55th Line Infantry Regiment
      - 3rd Chasseur Battalion
    - 2nd Brigade : Jolivet
      - 76th Line Infantry Regiment
      - 77th Line Infantry Regiment
    - 1st Division Artillery : Lt. Col. Chavaudret
      - 2 Foot Artillery batteries (4-pdr. guns)
      - 1 Mitrailleuse battery
      - 3rd Engineer Regiment (1 company)
  - 2nd Infantry Division : Gen. Henri Jules Bataille
    - 1st Brigade : Gen. Pouget
      - 8th Line Infantry Regiment
      - 23rd Line Infantry Regiment
      - 12th Chasseur Battalion
    - 2nd Brigade : Gen. Fauvart-Bastoul
      - 66th Line Infantry Regiment
      - 67th Line Infantry Regiment
    - 2nd Division Artillery : Lt. Col. de Maintenant
      - 2 Foot Artillery batteries (4-pdr. guns)
      - 1 Mitrailleuse battery
      - 3rd Engineer Regiment (1 company)
  - 3rd Infantry Division : Gen. Jules de Laveaucoupet
    - 1st Brigade : Gen. Doens
      - 2nd Line Infantry Regiment
      - 63rd Line Infantry Regiment
      - 10th Chasseur Battalion
    - 2nd Brigade : Gen. Michelet
      - 24th Line Infantry Regiment
      - 40th Line Infantry Regiment
    - 3rd Division Artillery : Lt. Col. Larrogue
      - 2 Foot Artillery batteries (4-pdr. guns)
      - 1 Mitrailleuse battery
      - 3rd Engineer Regiment (1 company)
  - Cavalry Division : Gen. Marmier
    - 1st Brigade : Gen. de Valabregue
      - 4th Chasseur Regiment
      - 5th Chasseur Regiment
    - 2nd Brigade : Gen. Bachelier
      - 7th Dragoon Regiment
      - 12th Dragoon Regiment
  - Reserve Artillery : Col. Beaudouin
      - 2 Foot batteries (4-pdr. guns)
      - 2 Foot batteries (12-pdr. guns)
      - 4 Horse Artillery batteries
      - 3rd Engineer Regiment (2 companies)
- 3rd Corps (3e corps) : Marshal Achille Bazaine
  - 1st Infantry Division
    - 1st Brigade : Gen. Montaudon
      - 51st Line Infantry Regiment
      - 62nd Line Infantry Regiment
      - 18th Chasseur Battalion
    - 2nd Brigade : Gen. Justin Clinchant
      - 81st Line Infantry Regiment
      - 95th Line Infantry Regiment
    - 1st Division Artillery : Lt. Col. Fourgous
      - 2 Foot Artillery batteries (4-pdr. guns)
      - 1 Mitrailleuse battery
  - 2nd Infantry Division : Gen. Armand Alexandre de Castagny
    - 1st Brigade : Gen. Nayral
      - 19th Line Infantry Regiment
      - 41st Line Infantry Regiment
      - 15th Chasseur Battalion
    - 2nd Brigade : Gen. Duplessis
      - 69th Line Infantry Regiment
      - 90th Line Infantry Regiment
    - 2nd Division Artillery : Lt. Col. Delange
      - 2 Foot Artillery batteries (4-pdr. guns)
      - 1 Mitrailleuse battery
      - 1st Engineer Regiment (1 company)
  - 3rd Infantry Division : Gen. Metman
    - 1st Brigade : Gen. de Potier
      - 7th Line Infantry Regiment
      - 29th Line Infantry Regiment
      - 7th Chasseur Battalion
    - 2nd Brigade : Gen. Eugène Arnaudeau
      - 59th Line Infantry Regiment
      - 71st Line Infantry Regiment
    - 3rd Division Artillery : Lt. Col. Sempe
      - 2 Foot Artillery batteries (4-pdr. guns)
      - 1 Mitrailleuse battery
      - 1st Engineer Regiment (1 company)
  - 4th Infantry Division : Gen. Claude Théodore Decaen
    - 1st Brigade : Gen. de Brauer
      - 44th Line Infantry Regiment
      - 60th Line Infantry Regiment
      - 11th Chasseur Battalion
    - 2nd Brigade : Gen. Sanle-Ferriere
      - 80th Line Infantry Regiment
      - 85th Line Infantry Regiment
    - 4th Division Artillery : Lt. Col. Maucoutant
      - 2 Foot Artillery batteries (4-pdr. guns)
      - 1 Mitrailleuse battery
      - 1st Engineer Regiment (1 company)
  - Cavalry Division : Gen. de Cleraembault
    - 1st Brigade : Gen. de Bruchard
      - 2nd Chasseur Regiment
      - 3rd Chasseur Regiment
      - 10th Chasseur Regiment
    - 2nd Brigade : Gen. Maubranches
      - 2nd Dragoon Regiment
      - 4th Dragoon Regiment
    - 3rd Brigade : Baron de Juniac
      - 5th Dragoon Regiment
      - 8th Dragoon Regiment
  - Reserve Artillery : Col. de Lajaille
      - 2 Foot Artillery batteries (4-pdr. guns)
      - 2 Foot Artillery batteries (12-pdr. guns)
      - 4 Horse Artillery batteries
      - 2nd Engineer Regiment (1 and 1/2 companies)
- 4th Corps (4e corps) : Gen. Paul de Ladmirault
  - 1st Infantry Division : Gen. Ernest Courtot de Cissey
    - 1st Brigade : Gen. Count Brayer
      - 1st Line Infantry Regiment
      - 6th Line Infantry
      - 20th Chasseur Battalion
    - 2nd Brigade : Gen. de Golberg
      - 57th Line Infantry Regiment
      - 73rd Line Infantry Regiment
    - 1st Division Artillery : Lt. Col. de Narp
      - 2 Foot Artillery batteries (4-pdr. guns)
      - 1 Mitrailleuse battery
      - 2nd Engineer Regiment (1 company)
  - 2nd Infantry Division : Gen. Grenier
    - 1st Brigade : Gen. Bellecourt
      - 13th Line Infantry Regiment
      - 43rd Line Infantry Regiment
      - 5th Chasseur Battalion
    - 2nd Brigade : Gen. Pradier
      - 64th Line Infantry Regiment
      - 98th Line Infantry Regiment
    - 2nd Division Artillery : Lt. Col. de Larminat
      - 2 Foot Artillery batteries (4-pdr. guns)
      - 1 Mitrailleuse battery
      - 2nd Engineer Regiment (1 company)
  - 3rd Infantry Division : Gen. Count Latrille de Lorencez
    - 1st Brigade : Gen. Pajol
      - 15th Line Infantry Regiment
      - 33rd Line Infantry Regiment
      - 2nd Chasseur Battalion
    - 2nd Brigade : Gen. Berger
      - 54th Line Infantry Regiment
      - 65th Line Infantry Regiment
    - 3rd Division Artillery : Lt. Col. Legardeur
      - 2 Foot Artillery batteries (4-pdr. guns)
      - 1 Mitrailleuse battery
      - 2nd Engineer Regiment (1 company)
  - Cavalry Division : Gen. Legrand
    - 1st Brigade : Gen. de Montaigu
      - 2nd Hussar Regiment
      - 7th Hussar Regiment
    - 2nd Brigade : Gen. de Gondrecourt
      - 3rd Dragoon Regiment
      - 11th Dragoon Regiment
  - Reserve Artillery : Col. de Solille
      - 2 Foot Artillery batteries (4-pdr. guns)
      - 2 Foot Artillery batteries (12-pdr. guns)
      - 4 Horse Artillery batteries
      - 2nd Engineer Regiment (1 company)
- 5th Corps (5e corps) : Gen. Pierre Louis Charles de Failly
  - 1st Infantry Division : Gen. Goze
    - 1st Brigade : Gen. Grenier
      - 11th Line Infantry Regiment
      - 46th Line Infantry Regiment
      - 4th Chasseur Battalion
    - 2nd Brigade : Gen. Nicolas
      - 61st Line Infantry Regiment
      - 86th Line Infantry Regiment
    - 1st Division Artillery
      - 2 4-pounder batteries
      - 1 Mitrailleuse battery
  - 2nd Infantry Division : Gen. de l'Abadie d'Aydroin
    - 1st Brigade : Gen. Lapasset
      - 49th Line Infantry Regiment
      - 84th Line Infantry Regiment
      - 14th Chasseur Battalion
    - 2nd Brigade : Gen. de Maussion
      - 88th Line Infantry Regiment
      - 97th Line Infantry Regiment
    - 2nd Division Artillery
      - 2 4-pounder batteries
      - 1 Mitrailleuse battery
  - 3rd Infantry Division : Gen. Guyot de Lespart
    - 1st Brigade : Gen. Abbatucci
      - 17th Line Infantry Regiment
      - 27th Line Infantry Regiment
      - 19th Chasseur Battalion
    - 2nd Brigade : Gen. de Fontanges de Couzan
      - 30th Line Infantry Regiment
      - 68th Line Infantry Regiment
    - 3rd Division Artillery
      - 2 4-pounder batteries
      - 1 Mitrailleuse battery
  - Cavalry Division : Gen. Brahaut
    - 1st Brigade : Gen. Pierre de Bernis
      - 5th Chasseur Regiment
      - 12th Chasseur Regiment
    - 2nd Brigade : Gen. de la Mortière
      - 3rd Lancer Regiment
      - 5th Lancer Regiment
    - Cavalry Division Artillery
      - 1 Horse Artillery battery
  - Reserve Artillery : Col. de Salignac-Fénelon
      - 2 Foot Artillery batteries (4-pdr. guns)
      - 2 Foot Artillery batteries (12-pdr. guns)
      - 2 Horse Artillery batteries
- 6th Corps (6e corps) : Marshal François Certain Canrobert
  - 1st Infantry Division : Gen. Tixier
    - 1st Brigade : Gen. Péchot
      - 4th Line Infantry Regiment
      - 10th Line Infantry Regiment
      - 9th Chasseur Battalion
    - 2nd Brigade : Gen. Le Roy de Dais
      - 12th Line Infantry Regiment
      - 100th Line Infantry Regiment
    - 1st Division Artillery
      - 2 4-pounder batteries
      - 1 Mitrailleuse battery
  - 2nd Infantry Division : Gen. Bisson
    - 1st Brigade : Gen. Noël
      - 9th Line Infantry Regiment
      - 14th Line Infantry Regiment
    - 2nd Brigade : Gen. Maurice
      - 20th Line Infantry Regiment
      - 30th Line Infantry Regiment
    - 2nd Division Artillery
      - 2 4-pounder batteries
      - 1 Mitrailleuse battery
  - 3rd Infantry Division : Gen. La Font de Villiers
    - 1st Brigade : Gen. Becquet de Sonnay
      - 75th Line Infantry Regiment
      - 91st Line Infantry Regiment
    - 2nd Brigade : Gen. Colin
      - 93rd Line Infantry Regiment
    - 3rd Division Artillery
      - 2 4-pounder batteries
      - 1 Mitrailleuse battery
  - 4th Infantry Division : Gen. Levassor-Sorval
    - 1st Brigade : Gen. Julius Richardson de Marguenat
      - 25th Line Infantry Regiment
      - 26th Line Infantry Regiment
    - 2nd Brigade : Gen. de Chanaleilles
      - 28th Line Infantry Regiment
      - 70th Line Infantry Regiment
    - 4th Division Artillery
      - 2 4-pounder batteries
      - 1 Mitrailleuse battery
  - Cavalry Division : Gen. de Salignac-Fénelon
    - 1st Brigade : Gen. Tilliard
      - 1st Hussar Regiment
      - 6th Chasseur Regiment
    - 2nd Brigade : Gen. Savaresse
      - 1st Lancer Regiment
      - 7th Lancer Regiment
    - 3rd Brigade : Gen. de Béville
      - 5th Cuirassier Regiment
      - 6th Cuirassier regiment
    - Cavalry Division Artillery
      - 2 Horse Artillery batteries
  - Reserve Artillery : Col. de Montluisant
      - 2 4-pounder batteries
      - 2 12-pounder batteries
      - 4 Horse Artillery batteries
- 7th Corps (7e corps) : Gen. Félix Charles Douay
  - 1st Infantry Division : Gen. Conseil-Dumesnil
    - 1st Brigade : Gen. Le Norman de Bretteville
      - 3rd Line Infantry Regiment
      - 21st Line Infantry Regiment
      - 17th Chasseur Battalion
    - 2nd Brigade : Gen. Maire
      - 47th Line Infantry Regiment
      - 99th Line Infantry Regiment
    - 1st Division Artillery
      - 2 4-pounder batteries
      - 1 Mitrailleuse batteries
  - 2nd Infantry Division : Gen. Liébert
    - 1st Brigade : Gen. Guiomar
      - 5th Line Infantry Regiment
      - 37th Line Infantry Regiment
      - 6th Chasseur Battalion
    - 2nd Brigade : Gen. de la Bastide
      - 53rd Line Infantry Regiment
      - 89th Line Infantry Regiment
    - 2nd Division Artillery
      - 2 4-pounder batteries
      - 1 Mitrailleuse battery
  - 3rd Infantry Division : Gen. Dumont
    - 1st Brigade : Gen. Bordas
      - 52nd Line Infantry Regiment
      - 72nd Line Infantry Regiment
    - 2nd Brigade : Gen. Bittard des Portes
      - 82nd Line Infantry Regiment
      - 83rd Line Infantry Regiment
    - 3rd Division Artillery
      - 2 4-pounder batteries
      - 1 Mitrailleuse battery
  - Cavalry Division : Gen. Ameil
    - 1st Brigade : Gen. Cambriel
      - 4th Hussar Regiment
      - 4th Lancer Regiment
      - 8th Lancer Regiment
    - 2nd Brigade : Gen. Jolif du Coulombier
      - 6th Hussar Regiment
      - 6th Dragoon Regiment
    - Cavalry Division Artillery
      - 1 Horse Artillery battery
  - Reserve Artillery
      - 2 4-pounder batteries
      - 2 12-pounder batteries
      - 2 Horse Artillery batteries
- Cavalry Reserve Corps (Corps de réserve de cavalerie)
  - 1st Division : Gen. du Barrail
    - 1st Brigade : Gen. Jean Auguste Margueritte
      - 1st Chasseurs d'Afrique
      - 3rd Chasseurs d'Afrique
    - 2nd Brigade : Gen. de Lajaille
      - 2nd Chasseurs d'Afrique
      - 4th Chasseurs d'Afrique
    - 1st Division Artillery
      - 2 Horse Artillery batteries
  - 2nd Division : Gen. de Bonnemains
    - 1st Brigade : Gen. Girard
      - 1st Cuirassier Regiment
      - 2nd Cuirassier Regiment
    - 2nd Brigade (?)
      - 3rd Cuirassier Regiment
      - 4th Cuirassier Regiment
    - 2nd Division Artillery
      - 2 Horse Artillery batteries
  - 3rd Division : Gen. Marquis de Forton
    - 1st Brigade : Gen. Prince Joachim Murat
      - 1st Dragoon Regiment
      - 9th Dragoon Regiment
    - 2nd Brigade : Gen. de Grammont
      - 7th Cuirassier Regiment
      - 10th Cuirassier Regiment
    - 3rd Division Artillery
      - 2 Horse Artillery batteries
- Artillery Reserve : Gen. Cann
  - 13th Field-Artillery Regiment
    - 8 12-pounder batteries
  - 18th Field-Artillery Regiment
    - 8 horse artillery batteries
    - 3 mountain batteries

French Infantry divisions were square divisions, with two infantry brigades of two infantry regiments each. Generally, one brigade per division also had a light infantry (chasseur) battalion. French cavalry divisions were also generally square, with two brigades of two regiments each, but the cavalry divisions of the Imperial Guard Corps, the 1st Corps, and the 6th Corps had three brigades.

French Regimental Histories (source = French Wikipedia)

== Germany ==
Order of battle on 1 August 1870:

Commander in Chief: Wilhelm I (King of Prussia)

Chief of the General Staff: General Helmuth von Moltke
Quarter-Master General: Generalleutnant Eugen Anton Theophil von Podbielski
Inspector-General of Artillery: General der Artillerie Gustav Eduard von Hindersin
Inspector-General of Engineers: Generalleutnant Franz von Kleist
Commissary-General: Generalleutnant Albrecht von Stosch
Staff Department Chiefs: Oberstleutnant Paul Bronsart von Schellendorff; Oberstleutnant Julius von Verdy du Vernois; Oberstleutnant Karl von Brandenstein

=== First Army ===
Commander: General Karl Friedrich von Steinmetz (later General von Manteuffel)

Chief of Staff: Generalmajor Oskar von Sperling

- VII Army Corps (VII. Armeekorps) (Westphalia) : General der Infanterie Heinrich von Zastrow
  - 13th Infantry Division : Generalleutnant Adolf von Glümer
    - 25th Brigade: Generalmajor Leo Baron von der Osten-Sacken
      - 1st Westphalian Infantry Regiment, No. 13
      - Hanoverian Fusilier Regiment, No. 73
    - 26th Brigade: Generalmajor Kuno Baron von der Goltz
      - 2nd Westphalian Infantry Regiment, No. 15
      - 6th Westphalian Infantry Regiment, No. 55
    - Attached to Division
      - 7th Westphalian Jäger Battalion
      - 1st Westphalian Hussar Regiment, No. 8
      - Five batteries (two heavy, two light, and one horse-artillery) of the 7th Field-artillery Regiment
      - 2nd Field-pioneer Company, 7th Corps, with entrenching tool-column
      - 3rd Field-pioneer Company, 7th Corps
  - 14th Infantry Division : Generalleutnant Georg von Kameke
    - 27th Brigade : Generamajor Curt von François
      - Lower Rhine Fusilier Regiment, No. 39
      - 1st Hanoverian Infantry Regiment, No. 74
    - 28th Brigade : Generalmajor Wilhelm von Woyna
      - 5th Westphalian Infantry Regiment, No. 53
      - 2nd Hanoverian Infantry Regiment, No. 77
    - Attached to Division
      - Four batteries (two heavy and two light) of the 7th Westphalian field-artillery Regiment
      - Hanoverian Hussar Regiment, No. 15
      - 1st Field-pioneer Company, 7th Corps, with light bridging-train
  - Corps Artillery : Oberst Rudolf von Helden-Sarnowski
    - Two Horse artillery, two light, and two heavy field-batteries of the 7th Field-artillery regiment
    - Artillery Ammunition columns
    - Infantry Ammunition columns
    - Pontoon columns
    - 7th Westphalian Train Battalion
- VIII Army Corps (VIII. Armeekorps) (Rhine Provinces) : General der Infanterie August Karl von Goeben
  - 15th Infantry Division : Generalleutnant Ludwig von Weltzien
    - 29th Brigade : Generalmajor Karl Friedrich von Wedel
      - East Prussian Fusilier Regiment, No. 33
      - 7th Brandenburg Infantry Regiment, No. 60
    - 30th Brigade : Generalmajor Otto von Strubberg
      - 2nd Rhine Province Infantry Regiment, No. 28
      - 4th Magdeburg Infantry Regiment, No. 67
    - Attached to Division
      - 8th Rhine Province Jäger Battalion
      - King's Hussar Regiment (1st Rhine), No. 7
      - Four batteries (two heavy, two light) of 8th Field-Artillery Regiment
      - 2nd Field-pioneer Company, 8th Corps, with entrenching tool-column
  - 16th Infantry Division : Generalleutnant Albert von Barnekow
    - 31st Brigade : Generalmajor Count Neidhardt von Gneisenau
      - 3rd Rhine Province Infantry Regiment, No. 29
      - 7th Rhine Province Infantry Regiment, No. 69
    - 32nd Brigade : Oberst Rudolf von Rex
      - Hohenzollern Fusilier Regiment, No. 40
      - 4th Thüringian Infantry Regiment, No. 72
    - Attached to Division
      - 2nd Rhine Hussar Regiment, No. 9
      - Four batteries (two heavy, two light) of 8th Field-artillery Regiment
      - 1st Field-pioneer Company, 8th Corps, with light bridging-train
      - 3rd Field-pioneer Company, 8th Corps
  - Corps Artillery : Oberst Rudolf von Broecker
    - Two batteries of horse-artillery, two heavy and two light field batteries of the 8th Field-artillery Regiment
    - Artillery and Infantry ammunition columns and pontoon columns belonging to the 8th Field-artillery Regiment
    - 8th Rhenish Train Battalion
- 3rd Cavalry Division : Generalleutnant Count Georg von der Gröben
  - 6th Cavalry Brigade : Generalmajor Richard von Mirus
    - Rhine Provinces Cuirassier Regiment, No. 8
    - Rhine Provinces Uhlan Regiment, No. 7
  - 7th Cavalry Brigade : Generalmajor Siegmar Count zu Dohna-Schlobitten
    - Westphalian Uhlan Regiment, No. 5
    - 2nd Hanoverian Uhlan Regiment, No. 14
  - One battery of horse-artillery of the 7th Westphalian Field-artillery Regiment
- I Army Corps (I. Armeekorps) (East Prussia) : General der Kavallerie Edwin Freiherr von Manteuffel (Note: I Korps and 1st Cavalry Division were listed after the other formations of First Army because their deployment was delayed by shortage of railway transport.)
  - 1st Infantry Division : Generalleutnant Georg Ferdinand von Bentheim
    - 1st Brigade : Generalmajor Wilhelm von Gayl
      - 1st (1st East Prussian) Grenadier Regiment "Crown Prince"
      - 41st (5th East Prussian) Infantry Regiment
    - 2nd Brigade : Generalmajor Louis von Falkenstein
      - 3rd (2nd East Prussian) Grenadier Regiment
      - 43rd (6th East Prussian) Infantry Regiment
    - Attached to Division
      - 1st East Prussian Jäger Battalion
      - 1st Lithuanian Dragoon Regiment
      - Four batteries (two heavy, two light) of 1st East Prussian Field Artillery Regiment
      - 2nd Field Pioneer Company, 1st Corps, with entrenching tool-column
      - 3rd Field Pioneer Company, 1st Corps
  - 2nd Infantry Division : Generalleutnant Gustav von Pritzelwitz
    - 3rd Brigade : Generalmajor Albert von Memerty
      - 4th (3rd East Prussian) Grenadier Regiment
      - 44th (7th East Prussian) Infantry Regiment
    - 4th Brigade : Generamajor Karl von Zglinitzki
      - 5th (4th East Prussian) Grenadier Regiment
      - 45th (8th East Prussian) Infantry Regiment
    - Attached to Division
      - 10th East Prussian Dragoon Regiment
      - Four batteries (two heavy, two light) of 1st East Prussian Field Artillery Regiment
      - 1st Field Pioneer Company, 1st Corps, with light bridging-train
  - Corps-Artillery : Oberst Maximilian Jungé
    - Two horse artillery batteries, two light field batteries, two heavy field batteries of 1st (East Prussian) Field Artillery Regiment
    - Artillery and Infantry ammunition, and pontoon columns belonging to 1st Field Artillery Regiment
    - 1st East Prussian Train Battalion
- 1st Cavalry Division : Generalleutnant Julius von Hartmann
  - 1st Cavalry Brigade : Generalmajor Hermann von Lüderitz
    - 2nd (Pomeranian) Cuirassier Regiment "Queen"
    - 4th (1st Pomeranian) Uhlan Regiment
    - 9th (2nd Pomeranian) Uhlan Regiment
  - 2nd Cavalry Brigade : Generalmajor August von Baumgarth
    - 3rd (East Prussian) Cuirassier Regiment "Count Wrangel"
    - 8th East Prussian Uhlan Regiment
    - 12th Lithuanian Uhlan Regiment
  - One battery of horse-artillery of the 1st East Prussian Field Artillery regiment

=== Second Army ===
Commander: General der Kavallerie Prince Friedrich Karl of Prussia

Chief of Staff: Oberst Gustav von Stiehle

- Guards Corps (Gardekorps) : General der Kavallerie Prince August of Württemberg
  - 1st Guards Infantry Division
    - 1st Guards Infantry Brigade
      - 1st Foot Guards
      - 3rd Foot Guards
      - Guards Fusilier Regiment
    - 2nd Guards Infantry Brigade
      - 2nd Foot Guards
      - 4th Foot Guards
    - Divisional Troops
      - Guards Jäger Battalion
      - Guards Hussars
      - 1st Foot Battalion, Guards Artillery
  - 2nd Guards Infantry Division
    - 3rd Guards Infantry Brigade
      - 1st Guards Grenadiers
      - 3rd Guards Grenadiers
    - 4th Guards Infantry Brigade
      - 2nd Guards Grenadiers
      - 4th Guards Grenadiers
    - Divisional Troops
      - Guards Rifles Battalion
      - 2nd Guards Uhlans
      - 3rd Foot Battalion, Guards Artillery
  - Guards Cavalry Division
    - 1st Guards Cavalry Brigade
      - Gardes du Corps
      - Guards Cuirassiers
    - 2nd Guards Cavalry Brigade
      - 1st Guards Uhlans
      - 3rd Guards Uhlans
    - 3rd Guards Cavalry Brigade
      - 1st Guards Dragoons
      - 2nd Guards Dragoons
  - Corps Artillery
    - 2nd Foot Battalion, Guards Artillery
    - Horse Artillery Battalion, Guards Artillery
    - Guards Train Battalion
    - Guards Engineer Battalion
- III Army Corps (III. Armeekorps) (Brandenburg) : Generalleutnant Constantin von Alvensleben
  - 5th Infantry Division : Generalleutnant Ferdinand von Stülpnagel
    - 9th Brigade : Generalmajor Wilhelm von Doering
      - Leib-Grenadier Regiment (1st Brandenburg), No. 8
      - 5th Brandenburg Infantry Regiment, No. 48
    - 10th Brigade : Generalmajor Kurt von Schwerin
      - 2nd Brandenburg Grenadier Regiment, No. 12
      - 6th Brandenburg Infantry Regiment, No. 52
    - Attached to Division
      - Brandenburg Jäger Battalion, No. 3
      - 2nd Brandenburg Dragoon Regiment, No. 12
      - Four batteries (two heavy, two light) of the Brandenburg Field-artillery Regiment, No. 3
      - 3rd Field-pioneer Company, 3rd Corps
  - 6th Infantry Division : Generalleutnant Gustav Freiherr von Buddenbrock
    - 11th Brigade : Generalmajor Louis von Rothmaler
      - 3rd Brandenburg Infantry Regiment, No. 20
      - Brandenburg Fusilier Regiment, No. 35
    - 12th Brigade : Oberst Hugo von Bismarck
      - 4th Brandenburg Infantry Regiment, No. 24
      - 8th Brandenburg Infantry Regiment, No. 64
    - Attached to Division
      - 1st Brandenburg Dragoon Regiment, No. 2
      - Four batteries (two heavy, two light) of the Brandenburg Field-artillery Regiment, No. 3
      - 2nd Field-pioneer Company, 3rd Corps, with entrenching tool-column
  - Corps-Artillery: Oberst Julius von Dresky und Merzdorf
    - Two horse artillery batteries, two light field batteries, two heavy field batteries of the Brandenburg Field-artillery Regiment, No. 3
    - 1st Field-pioneer Company, 3rd Corps, with light bridging-train
    - Artillery ammunition, Infantry ammunition, and pontoon columns of the Brandenburg Field-artillery Regiment, No. 3
    - Brandenburg Train Battalion
- IV Army Corps (IV. Armeekorps) (Saxon provinces and Anhalt) : General der Infanterie Gustav von Alvensleben
  - 7th Infantry Division : Generalleutnant Julius von Groß genannt von Schwarzhoff
    - 13th Brigade : Generalmajor August von Borries
      - 1st Magdeburg Infantry Regiment, No. 26
      - 3rd Magdeburg Infantry Regiment, No. 66
    - 14th Brigade : Generalmajor Franz von Zychlinski
      - 2nd Magdeburg Infantry Regiment, No. 27
      - Anhalt Infantry Regiment, No. 93
    - Attached to Division
      - Magdeburg Jäger Battalion, No. 4
      - Westphalian Dragoon Regiment, No. 7
      - Four batteries (two heavy, two light) of the Magdeburg Field-artillery Regiment
      - 2nd Field-pioneer Company, 4th Corps, with entrenching tool-column
      - 3rd Field-pioneer Company, 4th Corps
  - 8th Infantry Division : Generalleutnant Alexander von Schoeler
    - 15th Brigade : Generalmajor Friedrich von Kessler
      - 1st Thüringian Infantry Regiment, No. 31
      - 3rd Thüringian Infantry Regiment, No. 71
    - 16th Brigade : Oberst Karl von Scheffler
      - Schleswig-Holstein Fusilier Regiment, No. 86
      - 7th Thüringian Infantry Regiment, No. 96
    - Attached to Division
      - Thüringian Hussar Regiment, No. 12
      - Four batteries (two heavy, two light) of the Magdeburg Field-artillery Regiment, No. 4
      - 1st Field-pioneer Company, 4th Corps, with light bridge-train
  - Corps-Artillery : Oberst Albert Crusius
    - Two horse artillery batteries, two light field batteries, two heavy field batteries of the Magdeburg Field-artillery Regiment, No. 4
    - Artillery ammunition, infantry ammunition, and pontoon columns belonging to Magdeburg Field-artillery Regiment, No. 4
    - Magdeburg Train Battalion, No. 4
- IX Army Corps (IX. Armeekorps) (Schleswig-Holstein and Hesse) : General der Infanterie Albrecht Gustav von Manstein
  - 18th Infantry Division : Generalleutnant Karl von Wrangel
    - 35th Brigade : Generalmajor Heinrich von Blumenthal
      - Magdeburg Fusilier Regiment, No. 36
      - Schleswig Infantry Regiment, No. 84
    - 36th Brigade : Generalmajor Ferdinand von Below
      - 2nd Silesian Grenadier Regiment, No. 11
      - Holstein Infantry Regiment, No. 85
    - Attached to Division
      - Lauenburg Jäger Battalion, No. 9
      - Magdeburg Dragoon Regiment, No. 6
      - Four batteries (two heavy, two light) of Schleswig-Holstein Field-artillery Regiment, No. 9
      - 2nd Field-pioneer Company, 9th Corps, with entrenching tool-column
      - 3rd Field-pioneer Company, 9th Corps
  - Grand Ducal Hessian (25th) Infantry Division : Generalleutnant Prince Louis of Hesse
    - 49th Brigade : Generalmajor Ludwig von Wittich
      - 1st Infantry Regiment (Body Guard)
      - 2nd Infantry Regiment (Grand Duke's)
      - 1st (Guard) Jäger Battalion
    - 50th Brigade : Oberst Ludwig von Lyncker
      - 3rd Infantry Regiment
      - 4th Infantry Regiment
      - 2nd Jäger Battalion
    - (25th) Cavalry Brigade : Generalmajor Ludwig Baron von Schlotheim
      - 1st Reiter Regiment (Guard Cheveauxlegers)
      - 2nd Reiter Regiment (Leib Chevauxlegers)
      - One battery of horse-artillery, five field-batteries (two heavy, three light)
      - Pioneer company with light field bridge-train
  - Corps-Artillery : Oberst Hans Karl Wilhelm von Jagemann
    - One horse artillery battery, two light field batteries, two heavy field batteries of the Schleswig-Holstein Field-artillery Regiment, No. 9
- X Army Corps (X. Armeekorps) (Hanover, Oldenburg and Brunswick) : General der Infanterie Konstantin Bernhard von Voigts-Rhetz
  - 19th Infantry Division : Generalleutnant Emil von Schwartzkoppen
    - 37th Brigade : Oberst Peter von Lehmann
      - East Frisian Infantry Regiment, No. 78
      - Oldenburg Infantry Regiment, No. 91
    - 38th Brigade : Generalmajor Georg von Wedell
      - 3rd Westphalian Infantry Regiment, No. 16
      - 8th Westphalian Infantry Regiment, No. 57
    - Attached to Division
      - 1st Hanoverian Dragoon Regiment, No. 9
      - Four batteries (two heavy, two light) of Hanoverian Field-artillery Regiment, No. 10
      - 2nd Field-pioneer Company, 10th Corps, with entrenching tool-column
      - 3rd Field-pioneer Company, 10th Corps
  - 20th Infantry Division : Generalmajor Alexander von Kraatz-Koschlau
    - 39th Brigade : Generalmajor Emil von Woyna
      - 7th Westphalian Infantry Regiment, No. 56
      - 3rd Hanoverian Infantry Regiment, No. 79
    - 40th Brigade : Generalmajor Karl von Diringshofen
      - 4th Westphalian Infantry Regiment, No. 17
      - Brunswick Infantry Regiment, No. 92
    - Attached to Division
      - Hanoverian Jäger Battalion, No. 10
      - 2nd Hanoverian Dragoon Regiment, No. 16
      - Four batteries (two heavy, two light) of Hanoverian Field-artillery Regiment, No. 10
      - 1st Field-pioneer Company, 10th Corps, with light bridge-train
  - Corps Artillery : Oberst Moritz Baron von der Goltz
    - Two horse artillery batteries, two light field batteries, two heavy field batteries of Hanoverian Field-artillery Regiment, No. 10
    - Artillery and Infantry ammunition columns belonging to Hanoverian Field-artillery Regiment, No. 10
    - Hanoverian Train Battalion, No. 10
- XII. (Royal Saxon) Army Corps (XII. (Kgl. Sächs.) Armeekorps) : Crown Prince Albert of Saxony
  - 23rd (Royal Saxon) Infantry Division : Generalleutnant H.R.H. Prince George of Saxony, afterwards Generalmajor von Montbé
    - 1st Brigade, No. 45 : Generalmajor Ernst von Craushaar
      - 1st (Leib) Grenadier Regiment, No. 100
      - 2nd (King William of Prussia) Grenadier Regiment, No. 101
      - Rifle (Fusilier) Regiment, No. 108
    - 2nd Brigade, No. 46 : Oberst Alban von Montbé
      - 3rd Infantry Regiment (Crown Prince's), No. 102
      - 4th Infantry Regiment No. 103
    - Attached to Division
      - 1st Reiter Regiment (Crown Prince's)
      - Four batteries (two heavy, two light) of 12th Field-artillery Regiment
      - 2nd Company of 12th Pioneer Battalion with entrenching tool-column
      - 4th Company of 12th Pioneer Battalion
  - 24th (Royal Saxon) Infantry Division : Generalmajor Gustav Erwin Nehrhoff von Holderberg
    - 3rd Brigade, No. 47: Generalmajor August Emil Tauscher
      - 5th Infantry Regiment (Prince Frederic August's), No. 104
      - 6th Infantry Regiment, No. 105
      - 1st Jäger Battalion (Crown Prince's), No. 12
    - 4th Brigade, No. 48 : Oberst Julius von Schulz
      - 7th Infantry Regiment (Prince George's), No. 106
      - 8th Infantry Regiment, No. 107
      - 2nd Jäger Battalion, No. 13
    - Attached to Division
      - 2nd Reiter Regiment
      - Four batteries (two heavy, two light) of 12th Field-artillery Regiment
      - 3rd company of 12th Pioneer Battalion with light bridge-train
  - 12th Cavalry Division : Generalmajor Franz Count of Lippe
    - 1st Cavalry Brigade, No. 23 : Generalmajor Karl Krug von Nidda
      - Guard Reiter Regiment
      - 1st Uhlan Regiment, No. 17
    - 2nd Cavalry Brigade, No. 24 : Generalmajor Hugo Senfft von Pilsach
      - 3rd Reiter Regiment
      - 2nd Uhlan Regiment, No. 18
    - Attached to Division
      - One battery of horse-artillery of 12th Field-artillery Regiment
  - Corps Artillery : Oberst Bernhard Oskar von Funcke
    - One horse artillery battery, three light field batteries, three heavy field batteries of the 12th Field Artillery Regiment
    - Artillery and Infantry ammunition, and pontoon columns of the 12th Field-artillery Regiment
    - 12th Train Battalion
- 5th Cavalry Division : Generalleutnant Albert Baron von Rheinbaben
  - 11th Cavalry Brigade : Generalmajor Adalbert von Barby
    - Westphalian Cuirassier Regiment, No. 4
    - 1st Hanoverian Uhlan Regiment, No. 13
    - Oldenburg Dragoon Regiment, No. 19
  - 12th Cavalry Brigade : Generalmajor Adalbert von Bredow
    - Magdeburg Cuirassier Regiment, No. 7
    - Altmark Uhlan Regiment, No. 16
    - Schleswig-Holstein Dragoon Regiment, No. 13
  - 13th Cavalry Brigade : Generalmajor Hermann von Redern
    - Magdeburg Hussar Regiment, No. 10
    - 2nd Westphalian Hussar Regiment, No. 11
    - Brunswick Hussar Regiment, No. 17
  - Attached to Division
    - Two batteries horse-artillery
- 6th Cavalry Division : Generalleutnant H.S.H. Duke William of Mecklenburg-Schwerin
  - 14th Cavalry Brigade : Generalmajor Otto Baron von Diepenbroick-Grüter
    - Brandenburg Cuirassier Regiment, No. 6 (Emperor Nicholas I. of Russia)
    - 1st Brandenburg Uhlan Regiment, No. 3 (Emperor of Russia)
    - Schleswig-Holstein Uhlan Regiment, No. 15
  - 15th Cavalry Brigade : Generalmajor Gustav Waldemar von Rauch
    - 3rd Hussars “von Zieten”
    - 16th Hussars
  - Attached to Division
    - One battery of horse-artillery
- II Army Corps (II. Armeekorps) (Pomerania) : General der Infanterie Eduard von Fransecky (Note: II Korps was listed after the other formations of Second Army because its deployment was delayed by shortage of railway transport.)
  - 3rd Infantry Division : Generalmajor Ernst von Hartmann
    - 5th Brigade : Generalmajor Heinrich von Koblinski
      - Grenadier Regiment King Frederic William IV. (1st Pomeranian), No. 2
      - 5th Pomeranian Infantry Regiment, No. 42
    - 6th Brigade : Oberst Eberhard von der Decken
      - 3rd Pomeranian Infantry Regiment, No. 14
      - 7th Pomeranian Infantry Regiment, No. 54
    - Attached to Division
      - Pomeranian Jäger Battalion, No. 2
      - Neumark Dragoon Regiment, No. 3
      - Four batteries (two heavy, two light) of the 2nd Pomeranian Field-artillery Regiment
      - 1st Field-pioneer Company, 2nd Corps, with light bridge-train
  - 4th Infantry Division : Generalleutnant Hann von Weyhern
    - 7th Brigade : Generalmajor Albert von Trossel
      - Colberg Grenadier Regiment (2nd Pomeranian), No. 9
      - 6th Pomeranian Infantry Regiment, No. 49
    - 8th Brigade : Generalmajor Karl von Kettler
      - 4th Pomeranian Infantry Regiment, No. 21
      - 8th Pomeranian Infantry Regiment, No. 61
    - Attached to Division
      - Pomeranian Dragoon Regiment, No. 11
      - Four batteries (two heavy, two light) of Pomeranian Field-artillery Regiment, No. 2
      - 2nd Field-pioneer Company, 2nd Corps, with entrenching tool-column
      - 3rd Field-pioneer Company, 2nd Corps
  - Corps Artillery : Oberst Wilhelm Petzel
    - Two horse artillery batteries, two light field batteries, two heavy field batteries of the Pomeranian Field-artillery Regiment, No. 2
    - Artillery and infantry ammunition and pontoon columns of Pomeranian Field-artillery Regiment, No. 2
    - Pomeranian Train Battalion, No. 2

=== Third Army ===
Commander: Crown Prince of Prussia

Chief of Staff: Generalleutnant Leonhard von Blumenthal

- V Army Corps (V. Armeekorps) (Posen and Liegnitz) : Generalleutnant Hugo von Kirchbach
  - 9th Infantry Division : Generalmajor Karl Gustav von Sandrart
    - 17th Brigade : Oberst Alfred von Bothmer
      - 3rd Posen Infantry Regiment, No. 58
      - 4th Posen Infantry Regiment, No. 59
    - 18th Brigade : Generalmajor William von Voigts-Rhetz
      - King's Grenadier Regiment (2nd West Prussian), No. 7
      - 2nd Lower Silesian Infantry Regiment, No. 47
    - Attached to Division:
      - 1st Silesian Jäger Battalion, No. 5
      - 1st Silesian Dragoon Regiment, No 4
      - Four batteries (two heavy, two light) of the Lower Silesian Field-artillery Regiment, No. 5
      - 1st Field-pioneer Company, 5th Corps, with light bridge-train
  - 10th Infantry Division : Generalleutnant Christoph von Schmidt
    - 19th Brigade : Oberst Otto von Henning auf Schönhoff
      - 1st West Prussian Grenadier Regiment, No. 6
      - 1st Lower Silesian Infantry Regiment, No. 46
    - 20th Brigade : Generalmajor Rudolf Walther von Montbary
      - Westphalian Fusilier Regiment, No. 37
      - 3rd Lower Silesian Infantry Regiment, No. 50
    - Attached to Division:
      - Kurmark Dragoon Regiment, No. 14
      - Four batteries (two heavy, two light) of Field-artillery Regiment, No. 5
      - 2nd Field-pioneer Company, 5th Corps, with entrenching tool-column
      - 3rd Field-pioneer Company, 5th Corps
  - Corps-Artillery : Oberstleutnant Gustav Köhler
    - Two horse artillery batteries, two light field batteries, two heavy field batteries of the Lower Silesian Field-artillery Regiment, No. 5
    - Artillery and infantry ammunition, and pontoon columns of Field-artillery Regiment, No. 5
    - Lower Silesian Train Battalion, No. 5
- XI Army Corps (XI. Armeekorps) (Hesse, Nassau, Saxe-Weimar etc.) : Generalleutnant Julius von Bose
  - 21st Infantry Division : Generalleutnant Hans von Schachtmeyer
    - 41st Brigade : Oberst Hermann von Koblinski
      - Hessian Fusilier Regiment, No. 80
      - 1st Nassau Infantry Regiment, No. 87
    - 42nd Brigade : Generalmajor Hugo von Thiele
      - 2nd Hessian Infantry Regiment, No. 82
      - 2nd Nassau Infantry Regiment, No. 88
    - Attached to Division:
      - Hessian Jäger Battalion, No. 11
      - 2nd Hessian Hussar Regiment, No. 14
      - Four batteries (two heavy, two light) of Hessian Field-artillery Regiment No. 11
      - 1st Field-pioneer Company, 11th Corps, with light bridge-train
  - 22nd Infantry Division : Generalleutnant Hermann von Gersdorff
    - 43rd Brigade : Oberst Hermann von Kontzki
      - 2nd Thüringian Infantry Regiment, No. 32
      - 6th Thüringian Infantry Regiment, No. 95
    - 44th Brigade : Generalmajor Bernhard von Schkopp
      - 3rd Hessian Infantry Regiment, No. 83
      - 5th Thüringian Infantry Regiment, No. 94
    - Attached to Division:
      - 1st Hessian Hussar Regiment, No. 13
      - Four batteries (two heavy, two light) of Hessian Field-artillery Regiment
      - 2nd Field-pioneer Company, 11th Corps, with entrenching tool-column
      - 3rd Field-pioneer Company, 11th Corps
  - Corps-Artillery : Oberst Hermann von Oppeln-Bronikowski
    - Two horse artillery batteries, two light field batteries, two heavy field batteries of Hessian Field-artillery Regiment, No. 11
    - Artillery and Infantry ammunition, and pontoon columns of 11th Field-artillery Regiment
    - Hessian Train Battalion, No. 11
- I Royal Bavarian Corps (Kgl. Bayer. I. Korps) : General der Infanterie Ludwig Freiherr von der Tann
  - 1st Royal Bavarian Division : Generalleutnant Baptist von Stephan
    - 1st Brigade : Generalmajor Karl Dietl
      - Royal Bavarian Infantry Lifeguards Regiment
      - Two battalions of 1st Infantry Regiment (King's)
      - 2nd Jäger Battalion
    - 2nd Brigade : Generalmajor Karl von Orff
      - 2nd Infantry Regiment (Crown Prince's)
      - Two battalions of 11th Infantry Regiment (v. d. Tann)
      - 4th Jäger Battalion
    - Attached to Division:
      - 9th Jäger Battalion
      - 3rd Chevauxlegers Regiment (Duke Maximilian's)
      - Two 4-pounder and two 6-pounder batteries
  - 2nd Royal Bavarian Division : Generalleutnant Karl Count Pappenheim
    - 3rd Brigade : Generalmajor Ignaz Schumacher
      - 3rd Infantry Regiment (Prince Charles of Bavaria)
      - Two battalions of 12th Infantry Regiment (Queen Amalie of Greece)
      - 1st Jäger Battalion
    - 4th Brigade : Generalmajor Rudolph Baron von der Tann-Rathsamhausen
      - 10th Infantry Regiment (Prince Louis)
      - Two battalions of 13th Infantry Regiment (Emperor Francis Joseph of Austria)
      - 7th Jäger Battalion
    - Attached to Division:
      - 4th Chevauxlegers Regiment (King's)
      - Two 4-pounder and two 6-pounder batteries
  - Cuirassier Brigade : Generalmajor Johann Baptist von Tausch
    - 1st Cuirassier Regiment (Prince Charles of Bavaria)
    - 2nd Cuirassier Regiment (Prince Adalbert)
    - 6th Chevauxlegers Regiment (Grand Duke Constantine Nicolajusitch)
    - One battery of horse-artillery
  - Brigade of Reserve-Artillery : Oberst Heinrich Bronzetti
    - 1st Division. Two 6-pounder, one 4-pounder battery
    - 2nd Division. Two 6-pounder batteries
    - 3rd Division. Two 6-pounder batteries
    - 1st Field-Engineer Division
- II Royal Bavarian Corps (Kgl. Bayer. II. Korps) : General der Infanterie Jakob von Hartmann
  - 3rd Royal Bavarian Division : Generalleutnant Friedrich Wilhelm Walther von Walderstötten
    - 5th Brigade : Generalmajor Wilhelm von Schleich
      - 6th Infantry Regiment (King William of Prussia)
      - Two battalions of 7th Infantry Regiment (Hohenhausen)
      - 8th Jäger Battalion
    - 6th Brigade : Oberst Börries von Wissell
      - Two battalions of 14th Infantry Regiment (Hartmann)
      - 15th Infantry Regiment (King John of Saxony)
      - 3rd Jäger Battalion
    - Attached to Division:
      - 1st Chevauxlegers Regiment (Emperor Alexander of Russia)
      - Two 4-pounder and two 6-pounder batteries
  - 4th Royal Bavarian Division : Generallleutnant Friedrich Count von Bothmer
    - 7th Brigade : Generalmajor Heinrich Ritter von Thiereck
      - Two battalions of 5th Infantry Regiments (Grand Duke of Hesse)
      - 9th Infantry Regiment (Werde)
      - 6th Jäger Battalion
    - 8th Brigade : Generalmajor Joseph Maillinger
      - 3rd battalion of 1st Infantry Regiment
      - 3rd battalion of 5th Infantry Regiment
      - 1st battalion of 7th Infantry Regiment
      - 3rd battalion of 11th Infantry Regiment
      - 3rd battalion of 14th Infantry Regiment
      - 5th Jäger Battalion
    - Attached to Division:
      - 10th Jäger Battalion
      - 2nd Chevauxlegers Regiment
      - Two 4-pounder and two 6-pounder batteries
    - Uhlan Brigade : Generalmajor Wilhelm Baron von Mulzer
      - 1st Uhlan Regiment (Archduke Nicholas of Russia)
      - 2nd Uhlan Regiment (King's)
      - 5th Chevauxlegers Regiment (Prince Otto's)
      - One battery of horse-artillery
  - Brigade of Reserve Artillery : Oberst Johann von Pillement
    - 1st Division: One 4-pounder horse-artillery battery, two 6-pounder field batteries
    - 2nd Division: Two 6-pounder field batteries
    - 3rd Division: Two 6-pounder field batteries
    - 2nd Field-Engineer Division
- Combined Württemberg-Baden Corps (Kombiniertes Württembergisch-Badisches Korps)
  - Württemberg Field Division : Generallleutnant Hugo von Obernitz
    - 1st Infantry Brigade : Generalmajor Karl Bernhard von Reitzenstein
      - 1st Infantry Regiment (Queen Olga) (two battalions)
      - 7th Infantry Regiment (two battalions)
      - 2nd Jäger Battalion
    - 2nd Infantry Brigade : Generalmajor Adolf von Starkloff
      - 2nd Infantry Regiment (two battalions)
      - 5th Infantry Regiment (King Charles's battalion)
      - 3rd Jäger Battalion
    - 3rd Infantry Brigade : Generalmajor Adolf Baron von Hügel
      - 3rd Infantry Regiment (two battalions)
      - 8th Infantry Regiment (two battalions)
      - 1st Jäger Rattalion
    - Cavalry Division (Reiter-Division) : Generalmajor Friedrich Count von Scheler
      - 1st Reiter Regiment (King Charles) (four squadrons)
      - 2nd Reiter Regiment (King William) (two squadrons)
      - 4th Reiter Regiment (Queen Olga) (four squadrons)
    - 1st Field-artillery Division:
      - Two 4-pounder and one 6-pounder batteries
    - 2nd Field-artillery Division
      - Two 4-pounder and one 6-pounder batteries
    - 3rd Field-artillery Division
      - Two 4-pounder and one 6-pounder batteries
  - Baden Field Division : Generalleutnant Gustav von Beyer
    - 1st Infantry Brigade : Generalleutnant Karl du Jarrys von La Roche
      - 1st Leib Grenadier Regiment
      - Fusilier battalion of 4th Infantry Regiment
      - 2nd Grenadier Regiment (King of Prussia)
    - Combined (3rd) Infantry Brigade : Generalmajor Adolf Keller
      - 3rd Infantry Regiment
      - 5th Infantry Regiment
    - Attached to Division:
      - 3rd Dragoon Regiment (Prince Charles)
      - Four batteries (two heavy, two light)
      - Company of pontooners with light bridge-train and entrenching tool-column
    - Cavalry Brigade : Generalmajor Udo Baron von La Roche-Starkenfels
      - 1st Leib Dragoon Regiment
      - 2nd Dragoon Regiment (Margrave Maximilian)
      - One battery of horse-artillery
  - Corps-Artillery
    - Two heavy and two light field batteries
- 4th Cavalry Division : General der Kavallerie H.R.H. Prince Albert of Prussia
  - 8th Cavalry Brigade : Generalmajor Hiob von Hontheim
    - West Prussian Cuirassier Regiment, No. 5
    - Posen Uhlan Regiment, No. 10
  - 9th Cavalry Brigade : Generalmajor Otto von Bernhardi
    - West Prussian Uhlan Regiment, No. 1
    - Thüringian Uhlan Regiment, No. 6
  - 10th Cavalry Brigade : Generalmajor Rudolf von Krosigk
    - 2nd Leib Hussar Regiment, No. 2
    - Rhine Province Dragoon Regiment, No. 5
  - Two batteries of horse-artillery
- VI Army Corps (VI. Armeekorps) (Silesia) : General der Kavallerie Wilhelm von Tümpling (Note: VI Korps and 2nd Cavalry Division were listed after the other formations of Third Army because their deployment was delayed by shortage of railway transport.)
  - 11th Infantry Division : Generalleutnant Helmuth von Gordon
    - 21st Brigade : Generalmajor Wilhelm von Malachowski und Griffa
      - 1st Silesian Grenadier Regiment, No. 10
      - 1st Posen Infantry Regiment, No. 18
    - 22nd Brigade : Generalmajor Alexander von Eckartsberg
      - Silesian Fusilier Regiment, No. 38
      - 4th Lower Silesian Infantry Regiment, No. 51
    - Attached to Division:
      - 2nd Silesian Jäger Battalion, No. 6
      - 2nd Silesian Dragoon Regiment, No. 8
      - Four batteries (two heavy, two light) of the Silesian Field-artillery Regiment, No. 6
      - 3rd Field-pioneer Company, 6th Corps
  - 12th Infantry Division : Generalleutnant Otto von Hoffmann
    - 23rd Brigade : Generalmajor William Hounsell von Gündell
      - 1st Upper Silesian Infantry Regiment, No. 22
      - 3rd Upper Silesian Infantry Regiment, No. 62
    - 24th Brigade: Generalmajor Hermann von Fabeck
      - 2nd Upper Silesian Infantry Regiment, No. 23
      - 4th Upper Silesian Infantry Regiment, No. 63
    - Attached to Division:
      - 3rd Silesian Dragoon Regiment, No. 15
      - Four batteries (two heavy, two light) of the Silesian Field-artillery Regiment, No. 6
      - 1st Field-pioneer Company, 6th Corps, with light bridge-train
      - 2nd Field-pioneer Company, 6th Corps, with entrenching tool-column
  - Corps-Artillery: Oberst Karl Arnold
    - Two horse artillery batteries, two light field batteries, two heavy field batteries of the Silesian Field-artillery Regiment, No. 6
    - Artillery and Infantry ammunition, and pontoon columns of Silesian Field-artillery Regiment
    - Silesian Train Battalion, No. 6
- 2nd Cavalry Division : Generalleutnant Wilhelm Count of Stolberg-Wernigerode
  - 3rd Cavalry Brigade : Generalmajor Enno von Colomb
    - Silesian Leib Cuirassier Regiment, No. 1
    - Silesian Uhlan Regiment, No. 2
  - 4th Cavalry Brigade : Generalmajor Gustav Baron von Barnekow
    - 1st Leib Hussar Regiment, No. 1
    - Pomeranian Hussar Regiment (Blucher's Hussars), No. 5
  - 5th Cavalry Brigade : Generalmajor Friedrich von Baumbach
    - 1st Silesian Hussar Regiment, No. 4
    - 2nd Silesian Hussar Regiment, No. 6
  - Two batteries of horse-artillery

=== Reserve ===
- General Command over mobile troops in the I, II, IX, and X Corps Areas
  - 17th Infantry Division
  - Guard Landwehr Infantry Division
    - 1st Guard Landwehr Brigade
      - 1st Guard Landwehr Regiment
      - 2nd Guard Landwehr Regiment
    - 2nd Guard Landwehr Brigade
      - 1st Guard Grenadier Landwehr Regiment
      - 2nd Guard Grenadier Landwehr Regiment
  - 1st Landwehr Division
    - 1st Pomeranian Landwehr Brigade
      - 1st Combined Pomeranian Landwehr Regiment
      - 2nd Combined Pomeranian Landwehr Regiment
    - 2nd Pomeranian Landwehr Brigade
      - 3rd Combined Pomeranian Landwehr Regiment
      - 4th Combined Pomeranian Landwehr Regiment
  - 2nd (Brandenburg) Landwehr Division
    - 1st Brandenburg Landwehr Brigade
      - 1st Combined Brandenburg Landwehr Regiment
      - 2nd Combined Brandenburg Landwehr Regiment
    - 2nd Brandenburg Landwehr Brigade
      - 3rd Combined Brandenburg Landwehr Regiment
      - 4th Combined Brandenburg Landwehr Regiment
  - 3rd Combined Landwehr Division
    - West Prussian Landwehr Brigade
      - West Prussian Combined Landwehr Regiment
      - Lower Silesian Combined Landwehr Regiment
    - Posen Landwehr Brigade
      - 1st Combined Posen Landwehr Regiment
      - 2nd Combined Posen Landwehr Regiment
- 16 Landwehr Cavalry Regiments
- Reserve Foot Battalions of the Guard and 11 Line Artillery Regiments

== Belgium ==
Though not a belligerent in the conflict, the Belgian army was mobilized and placed on readiness at the country's borders in fear of a preemptive attack by either party through the neutral territory during the Franco-Prussian War. (See Belgium and the Franco-Prussian War).

Commander-in-Chief: King Leopold II

Chief of Staff: Lieutenant General Bruno Renard

Minister of War: Major General Henri Guillaume

=== Army of Observation ===
The Army of Observation (Armée d'Observation) numbered approximately 55,000 men. Its role was to defend the country's borders.

Commander: Lieutenant-General Baron Félix Chazal

Chief of Staff: Colonel Monoyer

- 1st Army Corps (Ier corps d'armée)
  - Commanded by Lieutenant-General Sapin
- 2nd Army Corps (IIe corps d'armée)
  - Commanded by Prince Philippe
- Artillery
- Reserve Cavalry
- Auxiliary units (Railway, logistics, telegraphic etc.)

=== Army of Antwerp ===
The Army of Antwerp (Armée d'Anvers), based in the "National Redoubt" fortress in Antwerp, numbered approximately 15,000. It was a defensive force, designed to hold the city of Antwerp alone. Approximately 8,000 additional men served as guards at other fortresses around the country, including Liège.

Commander: Lieutenant-General Alexis-Michel Eenens

Chief of Staff: Colonel Henri Alexis Brialmont

== Sources ==
- A. Niemann, Der französische Feldzug 1870-1871 (Verlag des Bibliographischen Instituts, Hildburghausen, 1871).
- Moltke, Helmuth von. "The Franco-German War of 1870-71". Project Gutenberg.
