= VIII Corps (German Empire) =

VIII Army Corps VIII. Armee-Korps
- Flag of the Staff of a Generalkommando (1871–1918)
- Active: 21 June 1815–1919
- Country: Prussia / German Empire
- Type: Corps
- Size: Approximately 44,000 (on mobilisation in 1914)
- Garrison/HQ: Koblenz/Castorpfaffen Straße 31
- Shoulder strap piping: Light Blue
- Engagements: Austro-Prussian War Battle of Königgrätz Franco-Prussian War Battle of Gravelotte Siege of Metz (1870) Battle of Hallue Battle of Amiens (1870) Battle of St. Quentin (1871) World War I Battle of the Frontiers

Insignia
- Abbreviation: VIII AK

The VIII Army Corps / VIII AK (German: VIII. Armee-Korps) was a corps level command of the Prussian and then the Imperial German Armies from the 19th Century to World War I.

Originating on 21 June 1815 as the General Command for the Grand Duchy of the Lower Rhine and established on 3 April 1820 as VIII Corps. The headquarters was in Koblenz and its catchment area was the Rhine Province and the Principality of Birkenfeld of the Grand Duchy of Oldenburg.

The Corps served in the Austro-Prussian War. During the Franco-Prussian War it was assigned to the 1st Army.

In peacetime the Corps was assigned to the V Army Inspectorate but joined the 4th Army at the start of the First World War. It was still in existence at the end of the war. The Corps was disbanded with the demobilisation of the German Army after World War I.

== Austro-Prussian War ==
VIII Corps fought in the Austro-Prussian War in 1866, seeing action in the Battle of Königgrätz.

== Franco-Prussian War ==
During the Franco-Prussian War, the Corps formed part of the 1st Army. Initially involved in the battles around Metz (Battle of Gravelotte) and subsequent siege of the fortress. After the capitulation of Metz in October 1870 it took part in the fighting north of Paris in the Battle of Hallue and the siege of the fortress of Péronne. Subsequent battles followed at Amiens and finally at St. Quentin.

== Peacetime organisation ==
The 25 peacetime Corps of the German Army (Guards, I - XXI, I - III Bavarian) had a reasonably standardised organisation. Each consisted of two divisions with usually two infantry brigades, one field artillery brigade and a cavalry brigade each. Each brigade normally consisted of two regiments of the appropriate type, so each Corps normally commanded 8 infantry, 4 field artillery and 4 cavalry regiments. There were exceptions to this rule:

V, VI, VII, IX and XIV Corps each had a 5th infantry brigade (so 10 infantry regiments)
II, XIII, XVIII and XXI Corps had a 9th infantry regiment
I, VI and XVI Corps had a 3rd cavalry brigade (so 6 cavalry regiments)
the Guards Corps had 11 infantry regiments (in 5 brigades) and 8 cavalry regiments (in 4 brigades).

Each Corps also directly controlled a number of other units. This could include one or more

Foot Artillery Regiment
Jäger Battalion
Pioneer Battalion
Train Battalion

Peacetime organization of the Corps
Corps	Division	Brigade	Units	Garrison
VIII Corps	15th Division	29th Infantry Brigade	25th (1st Rhenish) Infantry "von Lützow"	Aachen
VIII Corps	15th Division	29th Infantry Brigade	161st (10th Rhenish) Infantry	Düren, II Bn at Eschweiler, III Bn at Jülich
VIII Corps	15th Division	80th Infantry Brigade	65th (5th Rhenish) Infantry	Cologne
VIII Corps	15th Division	80th Infantry Brigade	160th (9th Rhenish) Infantry	Bonn, I Bn at Diez, III Bn at Euskirchen
VIII Corps	15th Division	15th Field Artillery Brigade	59th (Berg) Field Artillery	Cologne
VIII Corps	15th Division	15th Field Artillery Brigade	83rd (3rd Rhenish) Field Artillery	Bonn, Düren
VIII Corps	15th Division	15th Cavalry Brigade	8th (Rhenish) Cuirassiers "Count Geßler"	Deutz
VIII Corps	15th Division	15th Cavalry Brigade	7th (1st Rhenish) Hussars "King William I"	Bonn
VIII Corps	16th Division	30th Infantry Brigade	28th (2nd Rhenish) Infantry "von Goeben"	Ehrenbreitstein Fortress, II Bn at Koblenz
VIII Corps	16th Division	30th Infantry Brigade	68th (6th Rhenish) Infantry	Koblenz
VIII Corps	16th Division	31st Infantry Brigade	29th (3rd Rhenish) Infantry "von Horn"	Trier
VIII Corps	16th Division	31st Infantry Brigade	69th (7th Rhenish) Infantry	Trier
VIII Corps	16th Division	16th Field Artillery Brigade	23rd (2nd Rhenish) Field Artillery	Koblenz
VIII Corps	16th Division	16th Field Artillery Brigade	44th (Trier) Field Artillery	Trier
VIII Corps	16th Division	16th Cavalry Brigade	7th Jäger zu Pferde	Trier
VIII Corps	16th Division	16th Cavalry Brigade	8th Jäger zu Pferde	Trier
VIII Corps	Corps Troops		2nd Machine Gun Abteilung	Trier
VIII Corps	Corps Troops		7th Fortress Machine Gun Abteilung	Cologne
VIII Corps	Corps Troops		9th (Schleswig-Holstein) Foot Artillery	Ehrenbreitstein Fortress
VIII Corps	Corps Troops		8th (1st Rhenish) Pioneer Battalion	Koblenz
VIII Corps	Corps Troops		30th (3rd Rhenish) (Fortress-)Pioneer Battalion	Ehrenbreitstein Fortress
VIII Corps	Corps Troops		3rd Telegraph Battalion	Koblenz, Darmstadt
VIII Corps	Corps Troops		6th Fortress Telephone Company	Cologne
VIII Corps	Corps Troops		3rd Airship Battalion	Cologne, Düsseldorf, Darmstadt
VIII Corps	Corps Troops		3rd Flying Battalion	Cologne, Hannover, Darmstadt
VIII Corps	Corps Troops		8th (1st Rhenish) Train Battalion	Koblenz
VIII Corps	Cöln Defence Command (Landwehr-Inspektion)			Cologne

== World War I ==
=== Organisation on mobilisation ===
On mobilization on 2 August 1914 the Corps was restructured. 16th Cavalry Brigade was withdrawn to form part of the 3rd Cavalry Division and the 15th Cavalry Brigade was broken up and its regiments assigned to the divisions as reconnaissance units. Divisions received engineer companies and other support units from the Corps headquarters. In summary, VIII Corps mobilised with 24 infantry battalions, 8 machine gun companies (48 machine guns), 8 cavalry squadrons, 24 field artillery batteries (144 guns), 4 heavy artillery batteries (16 guns), 3 pioneer companies and an aviation detachment.

Initial wartime organization of the Corps
Corps	Division	Brigade	Units
VIII Corps	15th Division	29th Infantry Brigade	25th Infantry Regiment
VIII Corps	15th Division	29th Infantry Brigade	161st Infantry Regiment
VIII Corps	15th Division	80th Infantry Brigade	65th Infantry Regiment
VIII Corps	15th Division	80th Infantry Brigade	161st Infantry Regiment
VIII Corps	15th Division	15th Field Artillery Brigade	59th Field Artillery Regiment
VIII Corps	15th Division	15th Field Artillery Brigade	83rd Field Artillery Regiment
VIII Corps	15th Division		8th Cuirassier Regiment
VIII Corps	15th Division		1st Company, 8th Pioneer Battalion
VIII Corps	15th Division		15th Divisional Pontoon Train
VIII Corps	15th Division		1st Medical Company
VIII Corps	15th Division		3rd Medical Company
VIII Corps	16th Division	30th Infantry Brigade	28th Infantry Regiment
VIII Corps	16th Division	30th Infantry Brigade	68th Fusilier Regiment
VIII Corps	16th Division	31st Infantry Brigade	29th Infantry Regiment
VIII Corps	16th Division	31st Infantry Brigade	69th Infantry Regiment
VIII Corps	16th Division	16th Field Artillery Brigade	23rd Field Artillery Regiment
VIII Corps	16th Division	16th Field Artillery Brigade	44th Field Artillery Regiment
VIII Corps	16th Division		7th Hussar Regiment
VIII Corps	16th Division		2nd Company, 8th Pioneer Battalion
VIII Corps	16th Division		3rd Company, 8th Pioneer Battalion
VIII Corps	16th Division		16th Divisional Pontoon Train
VIII Corps	16th Division		2nd Medical Company
VIII Corps	Corps Troops		III Battalion, 9th Foot Artillery Regiment
VIII Corps	Corps Troops		10th Aviation Detachment
VIII Corps	Corps Troops		8th Corps Pontoon Train
VIII Corps	Corps Troops		8th Telephone Detachment
VIII Corps	Corps Troops		8th Pioneer Searchlight Section
VIII Corps	Corps Troops		Munition Trains and Columns corresponding to II Corps

=== Combat chronicle ===
On mobilisation, VIII Corps was assigned to the 4th Army forming part of the centre of the forces for the Schlieffen Plan offensive in August 1914. It was still in existence at the end of the war.

== Commanders ==
The VIII Corps had the following commanders during its existence:

From	Rank	Name
21 June 1815	General der Infanterie	August Neidhardt von Gneisenau
20 May 1816	Generalleutnant	Ernst von Hake
3 April 1820	General der Kavallerie	Johann Adolf Freiherr von Thielmann
18 June 1825	General der Kavallerie	Karl Ludwig von Borstell
9 May 1840	Generalleutnant	Adolf Eduard von Thile
5 May 1848	General der Kavallerie	Friedrich Wilhelm Graf von Brandenburg
15 May 1849	General der Infanterie	Karl Friedrich von Hirschfeld
27 November 1859	General der Infanterie	Eduard von Bonin
29 June 1865	General der Infanterie	Eberhard Herwarth von Bittenfeld
18 July 1870	General der Infanterie	August Karl von Goeben
11 December 1880	Generalleutnant	Ludwig von Thile
12 January 1884	General der Kavallerie	Walter Freiherr von Loë
27 January 1895	General der Kavallerie	Adolf von Bülow
2 January 1896	General der Infanterie	Maximilian Vogel von Falckenstein
27 January 1897	General der Infanterie	Frederick II, Grand Duke of Baden
18 October 1902	General der Kavallerie	Adolf von Deines
2 October 1906	General der Infanterie	Paul von Ploetz
27 January 1912	Generalleutnant	Erich Tülff von Tschepe und Weidenbach
5 October 1914	General der Infanterie	Julius Riemann
18 December 1916	Generalleutnant	Karl Dieffenbach
12 March 1917	General der Infanterie	Otto von Plüskow
11 May 1917	Generalleutnant	Roderich von Schoeler

== See also ==
- Franco-Prussian War order of battle
- German Army order of battle (1914)
- List of Imperial German infantry regiments
- List of Imperial German artillery regiments
- List of Imperial German cavalry regiments

== Bibliography ==
- Cron, Hermann (2002). Imperial German Army 1914-18: Organisation, Structure, Orders-of-Battle [first published: 1937]. Helion & Co. ISBN 1-874622-70-1.
- Ellis, John; Cox, Michael (1993). The World War I Databook. Aurum Press Ltd. ISBN 1-85410-766-6.
- Haythornthwaite, Philip J. (1996). The World War One Source Book. Arms and Armour. ISBN 1-85409-351-7.
- Histories of Two Hundred and Fifty-One Divisions of the German Army which Participated in the War (1914-1918), compiled from records of Intelligence section of the General Staff, American Expeditionary Forces, at General Headquarters, Chaumont, France 1919. The London Stamp Exchange Ltd. 1989 [1920]. ISBN 0-948130-87-3.
- The German Forces in the Field; 7th Revision, 11th November 1918; Compiled by the General Staff, War Office. Imperial War Museum, London and the Battery Press. 1995 [1918]. ISBN 978-1-870423-95-3.
