= 3rd Cavalry Division (German Empire) =

3rd Cavalry Division (3. Kavallerie-Division)
- Flag of the Staff of a Division (1871–1918)
- Active: 2 August 1914-November 1916
- Disbanded: November 1916
- Country: German Empire
- Branch: Army
- Type: Cavalry
- Size: Approximately 5,000 (on mobilisation)
- Engagements: World War I

The 3rd Cavalry Division (3. Kavallerie-Division) was a unit of the Prussian Army, part of German Army in World War I. The division was formed on the mobilization of the German Army in August 1914. The division was disbanded in November 1916.

== Combat chronicle ==
It was initially assigned to IV Cavalry Corps, which preceded the 4th and 5th Armies on the Western Front. In December 1914, it was involved in occupation duties in Belgium. On 6 April 1915, it was transferred to Russia and dissolved there on 1 September 1916. It was reformed in Hungary on 9 September 1916 and later moved to Transylvania. It was finally dissolved in November 1916.

A more detailed combat chronicle can be found at the German-language version of this article.

== Order of Battle on mobilisation ==
On formation, in August 1914, the component units of the division were:

- 16th Cavalry Brigade (from VIII Corps District)
  - 7th Jäger zu Pferde
  - 8th Jäger zu Pferde
- 22nd Cavalry Brigade (from XI Corps District)
  - 5th (Rhenish) Dragoons "Baron Manteuffel"
  - 14th (2nd Kurhessian) Hussars "Landgrave Frederick II of Hesse-Homburg"
- 25th Cavalry Brigade (from XVIII Corps District)
  - 23rd Guards Dragoons (1st Grand Ducal Hessian)
  - 24th Life Dragoons (2nd Grand Ducal Hessian)
- Horse Artillery Abteilung of the 11th (1st Kurhessian) Field Artillery Regiment
- 2nd Machine Gun Detachment
- Pioneer Detachment
- Signals Detachment
  - Heavy Wireless Station 11
  - Light Wireless Station 18
  - Light Wireless Station 19
- Cavalry Motorised Vehicle Column 3

See: Table of Organisation and Equipment

== Changes in organization ==
- 16th Cavalry Brigade became independent on 1 September 1916
- 22nd Cavalry Brigade joined 2nd Cavalry Division on 13 August 1916
- 25th Cavalry Brigade joined 2nd Cavalry Division on 23 September 1916
- 1st Cavalry Brigade joined on 13 October 1916 from 1st Cavalry Division (renamed Siebenburgishe Cavalry Brigade on 1 June 1917.)

== See also ==
- German Army (German Empire)
- German cavalry in World War I
- German Army order of battle (1914)

== Bibliography ==
- Cron, Hermann (2002). Imperial German Army 1914-18: Organisation, Structure, Orders-of-Battle [first published: 1937]. Helion & Co. ISBN 1-874622-70-1.
- Ellis, John; Cox, Michael (1993). The World War I Databook. Aurum Press Ltd. ISBN 1-85410-766-6.
