= VII Corps (German Empire) =

VII Army Corps VII. Armee-Korps
- Flag of the Staff of a Generalkommando (1871–1918)
- Active: 1815–1919
- Country: Prussia / German Empire
- Type: Corps
- Size: Approximately 44,000 (on mobilisation in 1914)
- Garrison/HQ: Münster/Grevener-Straße 1
- Shoulder strap piping: Light Blue
- Engagements: Austro-Prussian War Battle of Königgrätz Franco-Prussian War Battle of Spicheren Battle of Borny-Colombey Battle of Gravelotte Siege of Metz World War I Battle of the Frontiers First Battle of the Marne First Battle of Ypres Battle of Verdun

Insignia
- Abbreviation: VII AK

The VII Army Corps / VII AK (German: VII. Armee-Korps) was a corps level command of the Prussian and then the Imperial German Armies from the 19th Century to World War I.

Originating in 1815 as the General Command for the Province of Westphalia, the headquarters was in Münster and its catchment area was the Province of Westphalia and the Principalities of Lippe and Schaumburg-Lippe.

The Corps served in the Austro-Prussian War. During the Franco-Prussian War it was assigned to the 1st Army.

In peacetime the Corps was assigned to the III Army Inspectorate which became the 2nd Army at the start of the First World War. It was still in existence at the end of the war in the 7th Army, Heeresgruppe Deutscher Kronprinz on the Western Front. The Corps was disbanded with the demobilisation of the German Army after World War I.

== Austro-Prussian War ==
VII Corps fought in the Austro-Prussian War in 1866, seeing action in the Battle of Königgrätz.

== Franco-Prussian War ==
During the Franco-Prussian War, the Corps formed part of the 1st Army and fought in several battles and engagements, including the Battle of Spicheren, the Battle of Borny-Colombey, the Battle of Gravelotte and the Siege of Metz.

== Peacetime organisation ==
The 25 peacetime Corps of the German Army (Guards, I - XXI, I - III Bavarian) had a reasonably standardised organisation. Each consisted of two divisions with usually two infantry brigades, one field artillery brigade and a cavalry brigade each. Each brigade normally consisted of two regiments of the appropriate type, so each Corps normally commanded 8 infantry, 4 field artillery and 4 cavalry regiments. There were exceptions to this rule:

V, VI, VII, IX and XIV Corps each had a 5th infantry brigade (so 10 infantry regiments)
II, XIII, XVIII and XXI Corps had a 9th infantry regiment
I, VI and XVI Corps had a 3rd cavalry brigade (so 6 cavalry regiments)
the Guards Corps had 11 infantry regiments (in 5 brigades) and 8 cavalry regiments (in 4 brigades).

Each Corps also directly controlled a number of other units. This could include one or more

Foot Artillery Regiment
Jäger Battalion
Pioneer Battalion
Train Battalion

Peacetime organization of the Corps
Corps	Division	Brigade	Units	Garrison
VII Corps	13th Division	25th Infantry Brigade	13th (1st Westphalian) Infantry "Herwarth von Bittenfeld"	Münster
VII Corps	13th Division	25th Infantry Brigade	158th (7th Lotharingian) Infantry	Paderborn, III Bn at Senne
VII Corps	13th Division	26th Infantry Brigade	15th (2nd Westphalian) Infantry "Prince Frederick of the Netherlands"	Minden
VII Corps	13th Division	26th Infantry Brigade	55th (6th Westphalian) Infantry "Count Bülow von Dennewitz"	Detmold, I Bn at Höxter, II Bn at Bielefeld
VII Corps	13th Division	13th Field Artillery Brigade	22nd (2nd Westphalian) Field Artillery	Münster
VII Corps	13th Division	13th Field Artillery Brigade	58th (Minden) Field Artillery	Minden
VII Corps	13th Division	13th Cavalry Brigade	4th (Westphalian) Cuirassiers "von Driesen"	Münster
VII Corps	13th Division	13th Cavalry Brigade	8th (1st Westphalian) Hussars "Emperor Nicholas II of Russia"	Neuhaus, Paderborn
VII Corps	14th Division	27th Infantry Brigade	16th (3rd Westphalian) Infantry "Baron Sparr"	Cologne
VII Corps	14th Division	27th Infantry Brigade	53rd (5th Westphalian) Infantry	Cologne
VII Corps	14th Division	28th Infantry Brigade	39th (Lower Rhenish) Fusiliers	Düsseldorf
VII Corps	14th Division	28th Infantry Brigade	159th (8th Lotharingian) Infantry	Mülheim/Ruhr, III Bn at Geldern
VII Corps	14th Division	79th Infantry Brigade	56th (7th Westphalian) Infantry "Vogel von Falkenstein"	Wesel, III Bn at Kleve
VII Corps	14th Division	79th Infantry Brigade	57th (8th Westphalian) Infantry "Duke Ferdinand of Brunswick"	Wesel
VII Corps	14th Division	14th Field Artillery Brigade	7th (1st Westphalian) Field Artillery	Wesel, Düsseldorf
VII Corps	14th Division	14th Field Artillery Brigade	43rd (Cleve) Field Artillery	Wesel
VII Corps	14th Division	14th Cavalry Brigade	11th (2nd Westphalian) Hussars	Krefeld
VII Corps	14th Division	14th Cavalry Brigade	5th (Westphalian) Uhlans	Düsseldorf
VII Corps	Corps Troops		7th (Westphalian) Jäger Battalion	Bückeburg
VII Corps	Corps Troops		7th Machine Gun Abteilung	Paderborn
VII Corps	Corps Troops		7th (Westphalian) Foot Artillery	Cologne
VII Corps	Corps Troops		7th (1st Westphalian) Pioneer Battalion	Cologne
VII Corps	Corps Troops		24th (2nd Westphalian) (Fortress-)Pioneer Battalion	Cologne
VII Corps	Corps Troops		7th (Westphalian) Train Battalion	Münster
VII Corps	Dortmund Defence Command (Landwehr-Inspektion)			Dortmund
VII Corps	Düsseldorf Defence Command (Landwehr-Inspektion)			Düsseldorf

== World War I ==
=== Organisation on mobilisation ===
On mobilization on 2 August 1914 the Corps was restructured. 13th and 14th Cavalry Brigades were withdrawn to form part of the 9th Cavalry Division. The 16th Uhlans, formerly of the IV Corps, was raised to a strength of 6 squadrons before being split into two half-regiments of 3 squadrons each. The half-regiments were assigned as divisional cavalry to 13th and 14th Divisions. 28th Infantry Brigade was assigned to the 14th Reserve Division with the VII Reserve Corps. Divisions received engineer companies and other support units from the Corps headquarters. In summary, VII Corps mobilised with 25 infantry battalions, 9 machine gun companies (54 machine guns), 6 cavalry squadrons, 24 field artillery batteries (144 guns), 4 heavy artillery batteries (16 guns), 3 pioneer companies and an aviation detachment.

Initial wartime organization of the Corps
Corps	Division	Brigade	Units
VII Corps	13th Division	25th Infantry Brigade	13th Infantry Regiment
VII Corps	13th Division	25th Infantry Brigade	158th Infantry Regiment
VII Corps	13th Division	26th Infantry Brigade	15th Infantry Regiment
VII Corps	13th Division	26th Infantry Brigade	55th Infantry Regiment
VII Corps	13th Division	26th Infantry Brigade	7th Jäger Battalion
VII Corps	13th Division	13th Field Artillery Brigade	22nd Field Artillery Regiment
VII Corps	13th Division	13th Field Artillery Brigade	58th Field Artillery Regiment
VII Corps	13th Division		staff and half of 16th Uhlan Regiment
VII Corps	13th Division		1st Company, 7th Pioneer Battalion
VII Corps	13th Division		13th Divisional Pontoon Train
VII Corps	13th Division		1st Medical Company
VII Corps	13th Division		3rd Medical Company
VII Corps	14th Division	27th Infantry Brigade	16th Infantry Regiment
VII Corps	14th Division	27th Infantry Brigade	53rd Infantry Regiment
VII Corps	14th Division	79th Infantry Brigade	56th Infantry Regiment
VII Corps	14th Division	79th Infantry Brigade	57th Infantry Regiment
VII Corps	14th Division	16th Field Artillery Brigade	7th Field Artillery Regiment
VII Corps	14th Division	16th Field Artillery Brigade	43rd Field Artillery Regiment
VII Corps	14th Division		half of 16th Uhlan Regiment
VII Corps	14th Division		2nd Company, 7th Pioneer Battalion
VII Corps	14th Division		3rd Company, 7th Pioneer Battalion
VII Corps	14th Division		14th Divisional Pontoon Train
VII Corps	14th Division		2nd Medical Company
VII Corps	Corps Troops		I Battalion, 7th Foot Artillery Regiment
VII Corps	Corps Troops		18th Aviation Detachment
VII Corps	Corps Troops		7th Corps Pontoon Train
VII Corps	Corps Troops		7th Telephone Detachment
VII Corps	Corps Troops		7th Pioneer Searchlight Section
VII Corps	Corps Troops		Munition Trains and Columns corresponding to II Corps

=== Combat chronicle ===
On mobilisation, VII Corps was assigned to the 2nd Army forming part of the right wing of the forces for the Schlieffen Plan offensive in August 1914 on the Western Front.

It participated in the First Battle of the Marne and First Battle of Ypres in 1914.

It was still in existence at the end of the war in the 7th Army, Heeresgruppe Deutscher Kronprinz on the Western Front.

== Commanders ==
The VII Corps had the following commanders during its existence:

From	Rank	Name
30 October 1815	Generalleutnant	Johann Adolf Freiherr von Thielmann
3 April 1820	Generalleutnant	Philipp von Luck und Witten
24 May 1820	Generalleutnant	Heinrich Wilhelm von Horn
28 November 1829	Generalleutnant	Karl Freiherr von Müffling
30 March 1837	General der Infanterie	Ernst von Pfuel
2 March 1848	General der Kavallerie	Karl von der Gröben
2 June 1853	General der Kavallerie	Ludwig Freiherr Roth von Schreckenstein
3 June 1858	Generalleutnant	Eduard von Bonin
6 November 1858	General der Kavallerie	Charles Anthony, Prince of Hohenzollern
20 January 1860	General der Infanterie	Eberhard Herwarth von Bittenfeld
21 November 1864	General der Infanterie	Eduard Vogel von Falckenstein
30 October 1866	General der Infanterie	Heinrich von Zastrow
5 September 1871	Generalleutnant	Wilhelm Graf zu Stolberg-Wernigerode
15 April 1882	General der Infanterie	Carl Friedrich von Witzendorff
7 August 1888	General der Kavallerie	Emil von Albedyll
3 June 1893	General der Infanterie	Robert von Goetze
5 April 1898	General der Infanterie	Viktor von Mikusch-Buchberg
27 January 1900	Generalleutnant	Ernst Freiherr von Bülow
18 May 1901	Generalleutnant	Moritz von Bissing
12 December 1907	General der Kavallerie	Friedrich von Bernhardi
11 August 1909	General der Kavallerie	Karl von Einem
16 September 1914	General der Infanterie	Eberhard von Claer
29 June 1915	General der Infanterie	Hermann von François
6 July 1918	Generalleutnant	Wilhelm von Woyna

== See also ==
- Franco-Prussian War order of battle
- German Army order of battle (1914)
- German Army order of battle, Western Front (1918)
- List of Imperial German infantry regiments
- List of Imperial German artillery regiments
- List of Imperial German cavalry regiments
- Order of battle of the First Battle of the Marne
- Order of First Battle of Ypres

== Bibliography ==
- Cron, Hermann (2002). Imperial German Army 1914-18: Organisation, Structure, Orders-of-Battle [first published: 1937]. Helion & Co. ISBN 1-874622-70-1.
- Ellis, John; Cox, Michael (1993). The World War I Databook. Aurum Press Ltd. ISBN 1-85410-766-6.
- Haythornthwaite, Philip J. (1996). The World War One Source Book. Arms and Armour. ISBN 1-85409-351-7.
- Histories of Two Hundred and Fifty-One Divisions of the German Army which Participated in the War (1914–1918), compiled from records of Intelligence section of the General Staff, American Expeditionary Forces, at General Headquarters, Chaumont, France 1919. The London Stamp Exchange Ltd. 1989 [1920]. ISBN 0-948130-87-3.
- The German Forces in the Field; 7th Revision, 11th November 1918; Compiled by the General Staff, War Office. Imperial War Museum, London and the Battery Press. 1995 [1918]. ISBN 978-1-870423-95-3.
