= 1st Cavalry Division (German Empire) =

Military unit

- 1. Kavallerie-Division
- Flag of the Staff of a Division (1871–1918)
- Active: 2 August 1914–1919
- Disbanded: 1919
- Country: German Empire
- Branch: Imperial German Army
- Type: Cavalry
- Size: Approximately 5,000 (on mobilisation)
- Engagements: World War I Battle of Stallupönen Battle of Gumbinnen Battle of Tannenberg First Battle of the Masurian Lakes

The 1st Cavalry Division (German: 1. Kavallerie-Division) was a unit of the Imperial German Army in World War I. The division was formed on the mobilization of the German Army in August 1914. The division was disbanded in 1919 during the demobilization of the German Army after World War I.

== Combat chronicle ==
Initially, it was the sole cavalry division on the Eastern Front, where it was assigned to the 8th Army. It remained in the East throughout the war. From 6 January 1915 to 22 August 1917, the division was involved in coastal defence duties in northern Courland. It was transferred to Ukraine in March 1918, where it remained until 29 January 1919. From 16 January 1918, it contained just one brigade of 3 regiments.

== Battle Calendar ==
The Division was formed as part of the mobilization at the beginning of World War I and was used exclusively on the Eastern Front. Here it remained as a German Police Force after the Treaty of Brest-Litovsk. It was first used in Livonia and Estonia and then came to Ukraine, where it remained until 16 March 1919.

1914

- – 17 August – Battle of Stallupönen
- 19 to 20 August – Battle of Gumbinnen
- 23–31 August – Battle of Tannenberg
- 5–15 September – First Battle of the Masurian Lakes
- 25 to 30 September – Battle of the Njemen
- 1 October to 5 November – position Fights at Grajewo-Wiżajny
- 6–8 November – Battle of Göritten
- 13–16 November – Battle of the Romintener Heath
- From 15 November – jockeying for position for The Field position at Lötzen and at the Angerapp

1915

- – Until 7 February – jockeying for position for the Field Position Lötzen-Angerapp.
- 8–22 February – Second Battle of the Masurian Lakes
- 23 February to 6 March – Battles at the Bobr
- 7–16 March – Battles in the Border position Seirijai-Simnas-Luzhwinov and Marijampolė
- 9–12 March – Battles at Sejny
- 25–30 March – Battles at Krasnopol and Krasne
- 31 March to 20 July – Position Battles between Augustów, Marijampolė and Pilviškiai
- 21 July to 7 August – battles at the Jiesiai and at Veiveriai
- 8–18 August – Siege of Kaunas
- 19 August to 8 September – Njemen battle
- 9 September – Širvintos
- 9 to 24 September – Battle of Vilnius
- 24 September to 19 October – Battles at the Mjadsjolka and Drysvyaty
- From 6 November – Coastal Protection in Northern Courland

1916

- – Coastal Protection Northern Courland

1917

- – Until 22 August – Coastal Protection North Courland
- 23 January to 3 February – Winter Battle on the Lielupe
- 1–5 September – Riga offensive (1917)
- 6 September to 28 October – Position Battles north of the Daugava
- From 29 October – Crew service at Budget Inspection 10

1918

- – Until 10 March – Crew service at Budget Inspection 10
- 11 March to 2 May – Occupation of Livonia and Estonia as a German Police force
- 3 May to 21 June – Fighting in Ukraine
- 22 June to 15 November – Occupation of Ukraine
- From 16 November – Eviction of Ukraine

1919

- – Until 16 March – Evacuation of Ukraine

== Order of Battle on mobilisation ==
On formation, in August 1914, the component units of the division were:

Brigade	From	Regiment
1st Cavalry Brigade	I Corps District	3rd (East Prussian) Cuirassiers "Count Wrangel"
1st Cavalry Brigade	I Corps District	1st (Lithuanian) Dragoons "Prince Albrecht of Prussia"
2nd Cavalry Brigade	I Corps District	12th (Lithuanian) Uhlans
2nd Cavalry Brigade	I Corps District	9th Mounted Rifles
41st Cavalry Brigade	XX Corps District	5th (West Prussian) Cuirassiers "Duke Frederick Eugene of Württemberg"
41st Cavalry Brigade	XX Corps District	4th (1st Pomeranian) Uhlans "von Schmidt"

- Horse Artillery Abteilung of the 1st (1st Lithuanian) Field Artillery "Prince August of Prussia" Regiment
- 5th Machine Gun Detachment
- Pioneer Detachment
- Signals Detachment
  - Heavy Wireless Station 17
  - Light Wireless Station 7
  - Light Wireless Station 14
- Cavalry Motorised Vehicle Column 1

See: Table of Organisation and Equipment

== Late World War I organization ==
In the course of the War, the Division saw a number of changes to its assigned Brigades.

- 1st Cavalry Brigade became independent on 3 October 1916.
- 41st Cavalry Brigade was transferred to 7th Cavalry Division on 17 October 1916.
- 8th Cavalry Brigade joined from 2nd Cavalry Division on 25 July 1916 before moving on to the 6th Cavalry Division on 18 October 1916.
- 18th Cavalry Brigade joined from 4th Cavalry Division on 12 December 1916 before moving on to XXXXI Reserve Corps on 15 January 1918.
- 23rd Cavalry Brigade joined from 8th Cavalry Division on 1 February 1917 before becoming independent on 22 October 1917.

Allied Intelligence did not rate the Division's fighting value. Its late war organisation was:

- 2nd Cavalry Brigade
  - 3rd (East Prussian) Cuirassiers "Count Wrangel"
  - 1st (Lithuanian) Dragoons "Prince Albrecht of Prussia"
  - 12th (Lithuanian) Uhlans
- Horse Artillery Abteilung of the 1st (Prince August of Prussia) (1st Lithuanian) Field Artillery Regiment
- Horse Artillery Abteilung of the 35th (1st West Prussian) Field Artillery Regiment
- 1st Pioneer Detachment
- 347th Searchlight Section
- 70th Ambulance Company
- 66th Vet. Hospital
- 142nd Vet. Hospital
- 152nd Cyclist Company
- 153rd Cyclist Company
- 159th Cyclist Company

== See also ==
- German Army (German Empire)
- German cavalry in World War I
- German Army order of battle (1914)

== Bibliography ==
- Cron, Hermann (2002) [1937]. Imperial German Army 1914–18: Organisation, Structure, Orders-of-Battle. Helion & Co. ISBN 1-874622-70-1.
- Ellis, John; Cox, Michael (1993). The World War I Databook. Aurum Press Ltd. ISBN 1-85410-766-6.
- Histories of Two Hundred and Fifty-One Divisions of the German Army which Participated in the War (1914-1918), compiled from records of Intelligence section of the General Staff, American Expeditionary Forces, at General Headquarters, Chaumont, France 1919. The London Stamp Exchange Ltd. 1989 [1920]. ISBN 0-948130-87-3.
- The German Forces in the Field; 7th Revision, 11th November 1918; Compiled by the General Staff, War Office. Imperial War Museum, London and the Battery Press. 1995 [1918]. ISBN 978-1-870423-95-3.
