= IV Cavalry Corps (German Empire) =

IV Cavalry Corps (Höhere Kavallerie-Kommando Nr 4) Higher Cavalry Command No. 4
- Flag of the Staff of a Generalkommando (1871–1918)
- Active: 2 August 1914-January 1915
- Disbanded: January 1915
- Country: German Empire
- Branch: Army
- Type: Cavalry
- Size: Approximately 12,000 (on mobilisation)
- Engagements: World War I

Insignia
- Abbreviation: HKK 4

The IV Cavalry Corps (German: Höhere Kavallerie-Kommando 4 / HKK 4 literally: Higher Cavalry Command 4) was a formation of the German Army in World War I. The corps was formed on mobilization of the German Army in August 1914 and dissolved in January 1915 as the onset of trench warfare negated the requirement for large cavalry formations. It was commanded throughout its existence by General der Kavallerie Gustav Freiherr von Hollen.

== Combat chronicle ==
Initially on the Western Front with 3rd and 6th Cavalry Divisions preceding 4th and 5th Armies. Transferred to the East on 14 November 1914. Dissolved January 1915.

== Order of Battle on mobilisation ==
Initially, the Corps simply consisted of 2 Cavalry Divisions (with 2 Jäger battalions attached) without any Corps troops; in supply and administration matters, the Cavalry Divisions were entirely autonomous. The commander was only concerned with tactics and strategy, hence his title of Senior Cavalry Commander Höherer Kavallerie-Kommandeur.

On formation in August 1914, the Corps consisted of:

- 3rd Cavalry Division
- 6th Cavalry Division
- 5th Jäger Battalion
- 6th Jäger Battalion

Each cavalry division consisted of 3 cavalry brigades (6 regiments each of 4 squadrons), a horse artillery battalion Abteilung (3 four-gun batteries), a machine gun detachment (company size, 6 MGs), plus pioneers, signals and a motor vehicle column. A more detailed Table of Organisation and Equipment can be seen here. The Jäger battalions each consisted of 4 light infantry companies, 1 machine gun company (6 MGs), 1 cyclist company and a motorised vehicle column.

== Commanders ==
IV Cavalry Corps was commanded throughout its existence by General der Kavallerie Gustav Freiherr von Hollen.

== See also ==
- German Army (German Empire)
- German Army order of battle (1914)
- German cavalry in World War I
- TOE, German Cavalry Division, August 1914

== Bibliography ==
- Cron, Hermann (2002). Imperial German Army 1914-18: Organisation, Structure, Orders-of-Battle [first published: 1937]. Helion & Co. ISBN 1-874622-70-1.
