= List of Imperial German cavalry regiments =

This is a List of Imperial German cavalry regiments before and during World War I. In peacetime, the Imperial German Army included 110 regiments of cavalry. Some of these regiments had a history stretching back to the 17th century but others were only formed as late as October 1913.

On mobilisation, they were joined by 33 reserve cavalry regiments, 2 landwehr cavalry regiments and 1 ersatz cavalry regiment was also formed. Also on mobilisation, there were 38 landwehr squadrons (assigned to the mixed landwehr brigades) and 19 ersatz detachments (assigned to the mixed ersatz brigades).

== Pre-war regiments ==
Regiments that existed in the Peacetime Army
Regiment	Raised	Garrison	Corps
Gardes du Corps	23 June 1740	Potsdam	Guards Corps
Guards Cuirassiers	21 February 1815	Berlin	Guards Corps
1st Royal Saxon Guards Heavy Cavalry	31 October 1849	Dresden	XII Army Corps
Carabiniers (2nd Royal Saxon Heavy Cavalry)	1 November 1849	Borna	XIX Army Corps
1st Royal Bavarian Heavy Cavalry "Prince Charles of Bavaria"	16 July 1814	Munich	I Royal Bavarian Corps
2nd Royal Bavarian Heavy Cavalry "Archduke Francis Ferdinand of Austria"	24 September 1815	Landshut	I Royal Bavarian Corps
1st (Silesian) Life Cuirassiers "Great Elector"	1 July 1674	Breslau	VI Army Corps
2nd (Pomeranian) Cuirassiers “Queen”	2 April 1717	Pasewalk	II Army Corps
3rd (East Prussian) Cuirassiers "Count Wrangel"	19 April 1717	Königsberg	I Army Corps
4th (Westphalian) Cuirassiers "von Driesen"	19 April 1717	Münster	VII Army Corps
5th (West Prussian) Cuirassiers "Duke Frederick Eugene of Württemberg"	19 April 1717	Riesenburg	XX Army Corps
6th (Brandenburg) Cuirassiers "Emperor Nicholas I of Russia"	20 December 1691	Brandenburg	III Army Corps
7th (Magdeburg) Cuirassiers "von Seydlitz"	7 March 1815	Halberstadt, Quedlinburg	IV Army Corps
8th (Rhenish) Cuirassiers "Count Geßler"	7 March 1815	Deutz	VIII Army Corps
1st Guards Dragoons "Queen of Great Britain and Ireland"	21 February 1815	Berlin	Guards Corps
2nd Guards Dragoons "Empress Alexandra of Russia"	1860	Berlin	Guards Corps
1st (Lithuanian) Dragoons "Prince Albrecht of Prussia"	19 April 1717	Tilsit	I Army Corps
2nd (1st Brandenburg) Dragoons	24 April 1689	Schwedt/O.	III Army Corps
3rd (Neumark) Mounted Grenadiers "Baron Derfflinger"	29 December 1704	Bromberg	II Army Corps
4th (1st Silesian) Dragoons "von Bredow"	7 March 1815	Lüben	V Army Corps
5th (Rhenish) Dragoons "Baron Manteuffel"	7 May 1860	Hofgeismar	XI Army Corps
6th (Magdeburg) Dragoons	7 May 1860	Mainz	XVIII Army Corps
7th (Westphalian) Dragoons	7 May 1860	Saarbrücken	XXI Army Corps
8th (2nd Silesian) Dragoons "King Frederick III"	7 May 1860	Oels, Kreuzburg, Bernstadt, Namslau	VI Army Corps
9th (1st Hannover) Dragoons "King Charles I of Rumania"	25 November 1805	Metz	XVI Army Corps
10th (East Prussian) Dragoons "King Albert of Saxony"	27 September 1866	Allenstein	XX Army Corps
11th (Pomeranian) Dragoons "von Wedel"	27 September 1866	Lyck	XX Army Corps
12th (2nd Brandenburg) Dragoons "von Arnim"	27 September 1866	Gnesen	II Army Corps
13th (Schleswig-Holstein) Dragoons	27 September 1866	Metz	XVI Army Corps
14th (Kurmark) Dragoons	27 September 1866	Colmar/Elsaß	XV Army Corps
15th (3rd Silesian) Dragoons	27 September 1866	Hagenau	XV Army Corps
16th (2nd Hannover) Dragoons	24 March 1813	Lüneburg	X Army Corps
17th (1st Grand Ducal Mecklenburgian) Dragoons	6 November 1819	Ludwigslust	IX Army Corps
18th (2nd Grand Ducal Mecklenburgian) Dragoons	8 August 1867	Parchim	IX Army Corps
19th (Oldenburg) Dragoons	26 April 1849	Oldenburg	X Army Corps
20th (1st Baden) Life-Dragoons	23 March 1803	Karlsruhe	XIV Army Corps
21st (2nd Baden) Dragoons	6 January 1850	Bruchsal, Schwetzingen	XIV Army Corps
22nd (3rd Baden) Dragoons "Prince Charles"	6 January 1850	Mülhausen/Elsaß	XIV Army Corps
23rd Guards Dragoons (1st Grand Ducal Hessian)	6 April 1790	Darmstadt	XVIII Army Corps
24th Life Dragoons (2nd Grand Ducal Hessian)	1 December 1859	Darmstadt	XVIII Army Corps
25th (1st Württemberg) Dragoons "Queen Olga"	17 November 1813	Ludwigsburg	XIII Army Corps
26th (2nd Württemberg) Dragoons "King"	6 December 1805	Stuttgart-Cannstatt	XIII Army Corps
1st Royal Bavarian Chevau-légers "Emperor Nicholas of Russia"	29 June 1682	Nuremberg, Fürth	III Royal Bavarian Corps
2nd Royal Bavarian Chevau-légers "Taxis"	29 June 1682	Dillingen	III Royal Bavarian Corps
3rd Royal Bavarian Chevau-légers "Duke Charles Theodore"	23 January 1724	Dieuze	II Royal Bavarian Corps
4th Royal Bavarian Chevau-légers "King"	1 September 1744	Augsburg, Neu-Ulm	I Royal Bavarian Corps
5th Royal Bavarian Chevau-légers "Archduke Albrecht of Austria"	1 April 1776	Saargemünd, Zweibrücken	II Royal Bavarian Corps
6th Royal Bavarian Chevau-légers "Prince Albrecht of Prussia"	1 April 1803	Bayreuth, Neumarkt	III Royal Bavarian Corps
7th Royal Bavarian Chevau-légers	1 October 1905	Nuremberg	III Royal Bavarian Corps
8th Royal Bavarian Chevau-légers	1 October 1909	Munich	I Royal Bavarian Corps
Life Guards Hussars	21 February 1815	Potsdam	Guards Corps
1st Life Hussars "Totenkopf"	9 August 1741	Danzig-Langfuhr	XVII Army Corps
2nd Life Hussars "Queen Victoria of Prussia"	9 August 1741	Danzig-Langfuhr	XVII Army Corps
3rd (Brandenburg) Hussars “von Zieten”	30 September 1730	Rathenow	III Army Corps
4th (1st Silesian) Hussars "von Schill"	15 November 1741	Ohlau	VI Army Corps
5th (Pomeranian) Hussars "Prince Blücher of Wahlstatt"	16 January 1758	Stolp	XVII Army Corps
6th (2nd Silesian) Hussars "Count Götzen"	21 November 1808	Leobschütz, Ratibor	VI Army Corps
7th (1st Rhenish) Hussars "King William I"	7 March 1815	Bonn	VIII Army Corps
8th (1st Westphalian) Hussars "Emperor Nicholas II of Russia"	7 March 1815	Paderborn, Neuhaus	VII Army Corps
9th (2nd Rhenish) Hussars	7 March 1815	Straßburg/Els.	XV Army Corps
10th (Magdeburg) Hussars	19 November 1813	Stendal	IV Army Corps
2nd Westphalian Hussar Regiment, No. 11	5 December 1813	Krefeld	VII Army Corps
12th (Thuringian) Hussars	30 July 1791	Torgau	IV Army Corps
13th (1st Kurhessian) Hussars "King Umberto of Italy"	22 November 1813	Diedenhofen	XVI Army Corps
14th (2nd Kurhessian) Hussars "Landgrave Frederick II of Hesse-Homburg"	23 November 1813	Kassel	XI Army Corps
15th (Hannover) Hussars "Queen Wilhelmina of the Netherlands"	19 December 1803	Wandsbek	IX Army Corps
16th (Schleswig-Holstein) Hussars "Emperor Francis Joseph of Austria, King of Hungary"	27 September 1866	Schleswig	IX Army Corps
17th (Brunswick) Hussars	1 April 1809	Braunschweig	X Army Corps
18th (1st Royal Saxon) Hussars "King Albert"	26 October 1734	Großenhain	XII Army Corps
19th (2nd Royal Saxon) Hussars "Queen Carola"	30 July 1791	Grimma	XIX Army Corps
20th (3rd Royal Saxon) Hussars	1 October 1910	Bautzen	XII Army Corps
1st Guards Uhlans	14 April 1819	Potsdam	Guards Corps
2nd Guards Uhlans	14 April 1819	Berlin	Guards Corps
3rd Guards Uhlans	7 May 1860	Potsdam	Guards Corps
1st (West Prussian) Uhlans "Emperor Alexander III of Russia"	1 August 1745	Militsch, Ostrowo	V Army Corps
2nd (Silesian) Uhlans of Katzler	1 August 1745	Gleiwitz, Pless	VI Army Corps
3rd (1st Brandenburg) Uhlans "Emperor Alexander II of Russia"	15 May 1809	Fürstenwalde	III Army Corps
4th (1st Pomeranian) Uhlans "von Schmidt"	7 March 1815	Thorn	XX Army Corps
5th (Westphalian) Uhlans	7 March 1815	Düsseldorf	VII Army Corps
6th (Thuringian) Uhlans	18 December 1813	Hanau	XVIII Army Corps
7th (Rhenish) Uhlans "Archduke Frederick of Baden"	14 April 1734	Saarbrücken	XXI Army Corps
8th (East Prussian) Uhlans "Count zu Dohna"	6 September 1812	Gumbinnen, Stallupönen	I Army Corps
9th (2nd Pomeranian) Uhlans	7 May 1860	Demmin	II Army Corps
10th (Posen) Uhlans "Prince August of Württemberg"	7 May 1860	Züllichau	V Army Corps
11th (2nd Brandenburg) Uhlans "Count Haeseler"	7 May 1860	Saarburg	XXI Army Corps
12th (Lithuanian) Uhlans	7 May 1860	Insterburg	I Army Corps
13th (1st Hannover) King's Uhlans	19 December 1803	Hannover	X Army Corps
14th (2nd Hannover) Uhlans	10 December 1805	St. Avold, Mörchingen	XVI Army Corps
15th (Schleswig-Holstein) Uhlans	27 September 1866	Saarburg	XXI Army Corps
16th (Altmark) Uhlans "Hennigs von Treffenfeld"	27 September 1866	Salzwedel, Gardelegen	IV Army Corps
17th (1st Royal Saxon) Uhlans "Emperor Francis Joseph of Austria, King of Hungary"	1 April 1867	Oschatz	XII Army Corps
18th (2nd Royal Saxon) Uhlans	1 April 1867	Leipzig	XIX Army Corps
19th (1st Württemberg) Uhlans "King Charles"	9 July 1683	Ulm	XIII Army Corps
20th (2nd Württemberg) Uhlans "King William I"	24 July 1809	Ludwigsburg	XIII Army Corps
21st (3rd Royal Saxon) Uhlans	1 October 1905	Chemnitz	XIX Army Corps
1st Royal Bavarian Uhlans "Emperor William II, King of Prussia"	21 December 1863	Bamberg	II Royal Bavarian Corps
2nd Royal Bavarian Uhlans "King"	21 December 1863	Ansbach	II Royal Bavarian Corps
1st King's Mounted Rifles	1 October 1905	Posen	V Army Corps
2nd Mounted Rifles	1 October 1905	Langensalza	XI Army Corps
3rd Mounted Rifles	1 October 1905	Colmar	XV Army Corps
4th Mounted Rifles	1 October 1906	Graudenz	XVII Army Corps
5th Mounted Rifles	1 October 1908	Mülhausen/Elsaß	XIV Army Corps
6th Mounted Rifles	1 October 1910	Erfurt	XI Army Corps
7th Mounted Rifles	1 October 1913	Trier	VIII Army Corps
8th Mounted Rifles	1 October 1913	Trier	VIII Army Corps
9th Mounted Rifles	1 October 1913	Insterburg	I Army Corps
10th Mounted Rifles	1 October 1913	Angerburg, Goldap	I Army Corps
11th Mounted Rifles	1 October 1913	Tarnowitz, Lublinitz	VI Army Corps
12th Mounted Rifles	1 October 1913	St. Avold	XVI Army Corps
13th Mounted Rifles	1 October 1913	Saarlouis	XVI Army Corps

== Regiments formed on mobilisation ==
33 Reserve Cavalry Regiments, 2 Landwehr Cavalry Regiments and 1 Ersatz Cavalry Regiment were formed on mobilisation in August 1914 and assigned to field formations. Each of these had a strength of 3 squadrons.

Reserve, Landwehr and Ersatz Regiments raised on mobilisation
Regiment	Raised by	Divisional assignment	Corps assignment.
Reserve Guards Uhlans	Guards Corps	3rd Guards Division	Guards Reserve Corps
Reserve Guards Dragoons	Guards Corps	1st Guards Reserve Division	Guards Reserve Corps
1st Reserve Uhlans	I Corps	1st Reserve Division	I Reserve Corps
1st Reserve Hussars	XVII Corps	36th Reserve Division	I Reserve Corps
2nd Reserve Dragoons	III Corps	5th Reserve Division	III Reserve Corps
3rd Reserve Uhlans	III Corps	6th Reserve Division	III Reserve Corps
1st Reserve Schwere Reiter	IV Corps	7th Reserve Division	IV Reserve Corps
1st Reserve Jager zu Pferde	XI Corps	22nd Reserve Division	IV Reserve Corps
3rd Reserve Dragoons	V Corps	9th Reserve Division	V Reserve Corps
6th Reserve Uhlans	V Corps	10th Reserve Division	V Reserve Corps
4th Reserve Hussars	VI Corps	11th Reserve Division	VI Reserve Corps
4th Reserve Uhlans	VI Corps	12th Reserve Division	VI Reserve Corps
5th Reserve Hussars	VII Corps	13th Reserve Division	VII Reserve Corps
8th Reserve Hussars	VII Corps	14th Reserve Division	VII Reserve Corps
5th Reserve Uhlans	X Corps	15th Reserve Division	VIII Reserve Corps
2nd Reserve Schwere Reiter	VIII Corps	16th Reserve Division	VIII Reserve Corps
6th Reserve Hussars	IX Corps	17th Reserve Division	IX Reserve Corps
7th Reserve Hussars	IX Corps	18th Reserve Division	IX Reserve Corps
2nd Reserve Uhlans	II Corps	2nd Guards Reserve Division	X Reserve Corps
6th Reserve Dragoons	X Corps	19th Reserve Division	X Reserve Corps
Reserve Saxon Hussars	XII Corps	23rd Reserve Division	XII Reserve Corps
Reserve Saxon Uhlans	XIX Corps	24th Reserve Division	XII Reserve Corps
Reserve Wurttenberg Dragoons	XIII Corps	26th Reserve Division	XIV Reserve Corps
8th Reserve Dragoons	XIV Corps	28th Reserve Division	XIV Reserve Corps
7th Reserve Dragoons	XI Corps	21st Reserve Division	XVIII Reserve Corps
4th Reserve Dragoons	XVIII Corps	25th Reserve Division	XVIII Reserve Corps
1st Reserve Bavarian	I Royal Bavarian Corps	1st Bavarian Reserve Division	I Royal Bavarian Reserve Corps
5th Reserve Bavarian	III Royal Bavarian Corps	5th Bavarian Reserve Division	I Royal Bavarian Reserve Corps
5th Reserve Dragoons	II Corps	3rd Reserve Division	Directly subordinated to 8th Army
9th Reserve Hussars	III Corps	30th Reserve Division	Fortress Strassburg
2nd Reserve Hussars	IV Corps	33rd Reserve Division	Fortress Metz
3rd Reserve Schwere Reiter	XX Corps	35th Reserve Division	Fortress Thorn
1st Reserve Dragoons	XX Corps	n/a	Fortress Königsberg
1st Landwehr Cavalry	V Corps	3rd Landwehr Division	Landwehr Corps
2nd Landwehr Cavalry	VI Corps	4th Landwehr Division	Landwehr Corps
Ersatz Cavalry	VI Corps	4th Landwehr Division	Landwehr Corps

== See also ==
- Bavarian Army
- German cavalry in World War I
- List of Imperial German artillery regiments
- List of Imperial German infantry regiments

== Bibliography ==
- Cron, Hermann (2002). Imperial German Army 1914-18: Organisation, Structure, Orders-of-Battle [first published: 1937]. Helion & Co. ISBN 1-874622-70-1.
- Tessin, Georg (1974). Deutsche Verbände und Truppen, 1918–1939. Biblio Osnabrück. ISBN 3-7648-1000-9.
- The German Forces in the Field; 7th Revision, 11th November 1918; Compiled by the General Staff, War Office. Imperial War Museum, London and the Battery Press. 1995 [1918]. ISBN 978-1-870423-95-3.
