= Guards Reserve Uhlans =

Military unit

The Guard Reserve Uhlan Regiment (German: Garde-Reserve-Ulanen-Regiment) was a cavalry regiment in the Imperial German Army during the First World War.

Upon formation of the 4th Guard Infantry Division in May 1915, the regimental HQ and 1st and 3rd squadrons were assigned to it.

Thilo von Trotha, a post-war conservative politician, served with this regiment in 1914 and 1915.

== See also ==
- List of Imperial German cavalry regiments
