= 16th (Schleswig-Holstein) Hussars "Emperor Francis Joseph of Austria, King of Hungary" =

- Husaren-Regiment Kaiser Franz-Joseph von Österreich, König von Ungarn (Schleswig-Holsteinisches) Nr. 16
- Active: 1866–1918
- Disbanded: 1918
- Country: German Empire
- Branch: Prussian Army
- Type: Cavalry
- Role: Hussars
- Garrison/HQ: Schleswig
- Anniversaries: 27 September 1866
- Engagements: Franco-Prussian War; World War I

Commanders
- Colonel-in-chief: Emperor Francis Joseph I

Insignia
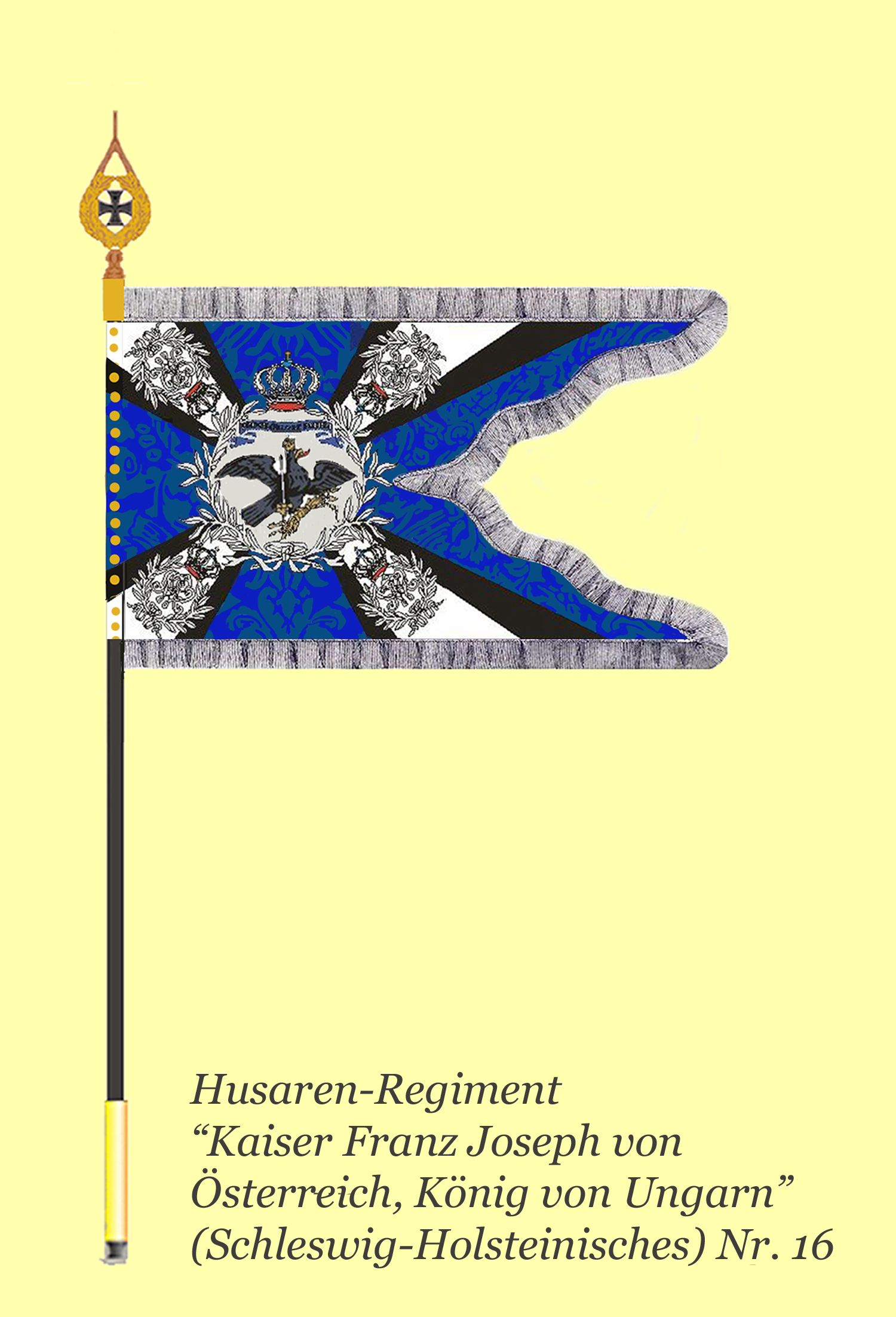
- Regimental colours

The 16th (Schleswig-Holstein) Hussars “Emperor Francis Joseph of Austria, King of Hungary” were a cavalry regiment of the Royal Prussian Army. The regiment was formed in 1866. It fought in the Franco-Prussian War and World War I. In 1872 it was named after Emperor Francis Joseph I of Austria, who became its colonel-in-chief. The regiment was stationed in Gottorf Castle until its disbanding in 1918.

== See also ==
- List of Imperial German cavalry regiments
