= Karl Gustav von Sandrart =

Prussian General

Karl Gustav von Sandrart (1817-1898) was a Prussian general in the Franco-Prussian War of 1870.

== Awards ==
- Order of San Fernando in 1859
- Pour le Merite on 16 February 1871
