= 9th Mounted Rifles =

Former Prussian regiment

The 9th Mounted Rifles were a light cavalry regiment of the Royal Prussian Army. The regiment was formed 1 October 1913 in Insterburg.

== See also ==
- List of Imperial German cavalry regiments
