= 1st Guards Uhlans =

Light cavalry regiment of Uhlans of the Royal Prussian Army

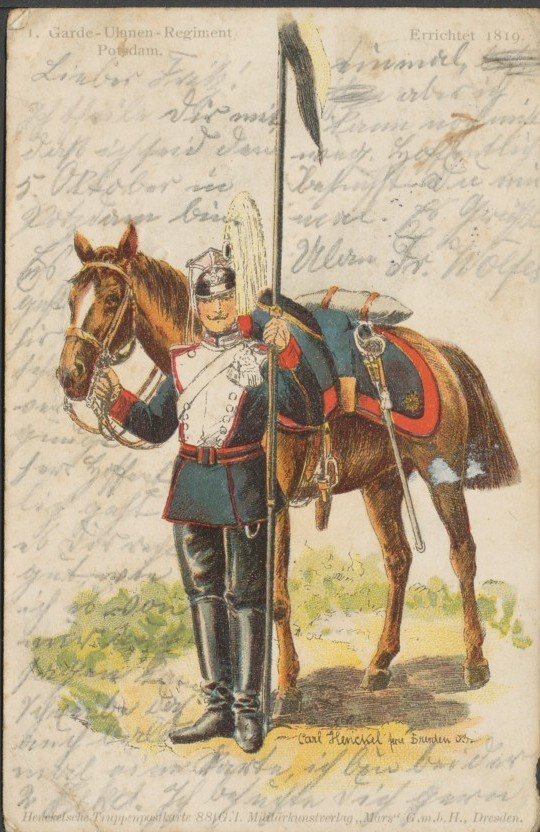
A postcard of an Uhlan of the regiment from 1912

Established in 1819 as the Garde-Landwehr Kavallerie Regiment, they were a light cavalry regiment of Uhlans of the Royal Prussian Army. The regiment was later reorganised as heavy cavalry Uhlans and renamed into 1. Garde Ulanen Regiment (1826) and fought in the Austro-Prussian War and Franco-Prussian War. In World War I the regiment was part of the Guards Cavalry Division fighting on the Western and Eastern Front.

== See also ==
- List of Imperial German cavalry regiments
