= 1st Royal Bavarian Chevau-légers "Emperor Nicholas of Russia" =

Military unit

The 1st Royal Bavarian Chevau-légers "Emperor Nicholas of Russia" (Königlich Bayerisches Chevaulegers-Regiment „Kaiser Nikolaus von Rußland“ Nr. 1) was a light cavalry regiment of the Royal Bavarian Army. The regiment was formed in 1682 and fought in the Battle of Vienna, the Great Turkish War, the War of the Spanish Succession, the War of the Austrian Succession, the Napoleonic Wars, the Austro-Prussian War, the Franco-Prussian War, and World War I. The regiment was disbanded in 1919.

== See also ==
- List of Imperial German cavalry regiments
