= 2nd Royal Bavarian Chevau-légers "Taxis" =

Bavarian cavalry regiment

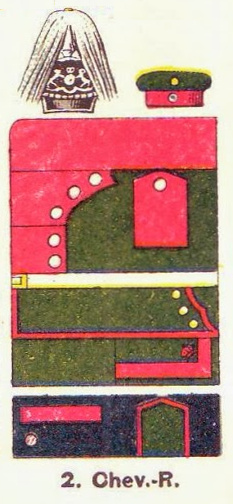
Schematic colour representation of the uniform of the Royal Bavarian 2nd Chevaulegers Regiment

The 2nd Royal Bavarian Chevau-légers "Taxis" (2. Königlich Bayerisches Chevaulegers-Regiment „Taxis“) were a light cavalry regiment of the Royal Bavarian Army. The regiment was formed in 1682 and disbanded in 1919. After the First World War the regiment's traditions were carried on by the 3rd squadron of the 17th (Bavarian) Reiter Regiment, and during the Third Reich by the 25th Panzer Regiment.

== See also ==
- List of Imperial German cavalry regiments
