= I Corps (German Empire) =

Corps level command of the Prussian and then the Imperial German Armies

I Army Corps I. Armee-Korps
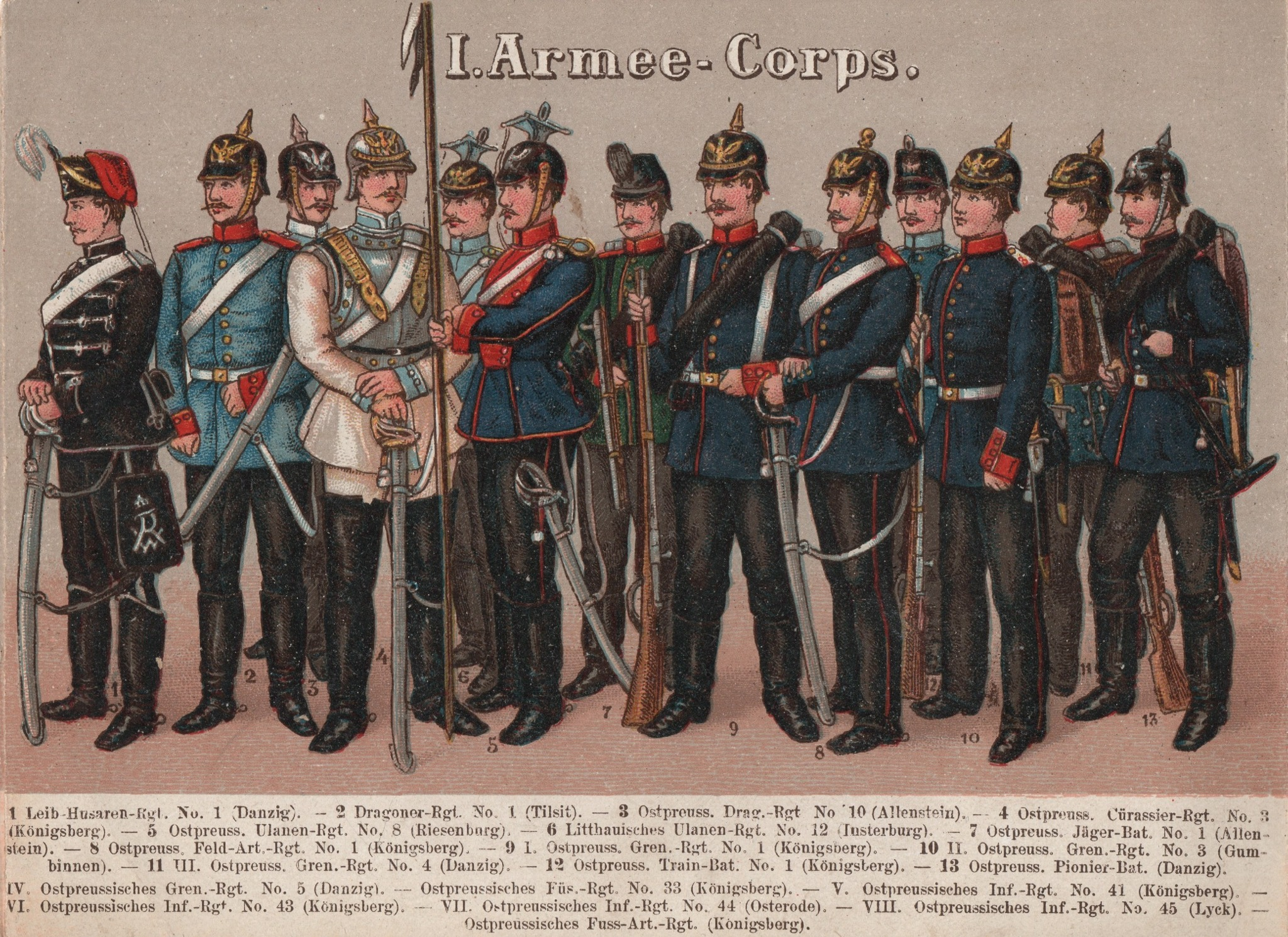
- Uniforms of the I Army Corps during La Belle Époque
- Active: 1814 (1820)–1919
- Country: Prussia / German Empire
- Type: Corps
- Size: Approximately 44,000 (on mobilisation in 1914)
- Garrison/HQ: Königsberg (now Kaliningrad, Russia)/Vorder-Roßgarten 54
- Shoulder strap piping: White
- Engagements: Austro-Prussian War Battle of Trautenau Battle of Königgrätz Franco-Prussian War Battle of Noiseville Battle of Gravelotte Siege of Metz Battle of Amiens (1870) Battle of Hallue Battle of St. Quentin (1871) World War I Battle of Stallupönen Battle of Gumbinnen Battle of Tannenberg (1914) First Battle of the Masurian Lakes

Insignia
- Abbreviation: I AK

The I Army Corps / I AK (German: I. Armee-Korps) was a corps level command of the Prussian and then the Imperial German Armies from the 19th Century to World War I.

It was established with headquarters in Königsberg (now Kaliningrad, Russia). Initially, the Corps catchment area comprised the entire Province of East Prussia, but from 1 October 1912 the southern part of the Province was transferred to the newly formed XX Corps District.

In peacetime, the Corps was assigned to the I Army Inspectorate, which became the 8th Army at the start of the First World War. The corps was still in existence at the end of the war, and was disbanded with the demobilisation of the German Army after World War I.

== Austro-Prussian War ==
The I Corps fought in the Austro-Prussian War against Austria in 1866, including the Battle of Trautenau and the Battle of Königgrätz.

== Franco-Prussian War ==
The Corps served in the Franco-Prussian War against France in 1870–1871. It saw action in the Battle of Noiseville, the Battle of Gravelotte, the Siege of Metz, the Battle of Amiens, the Battle of Hallue, and the Battle of St. Quentin, among other actions.

== Peacetime organisation ==
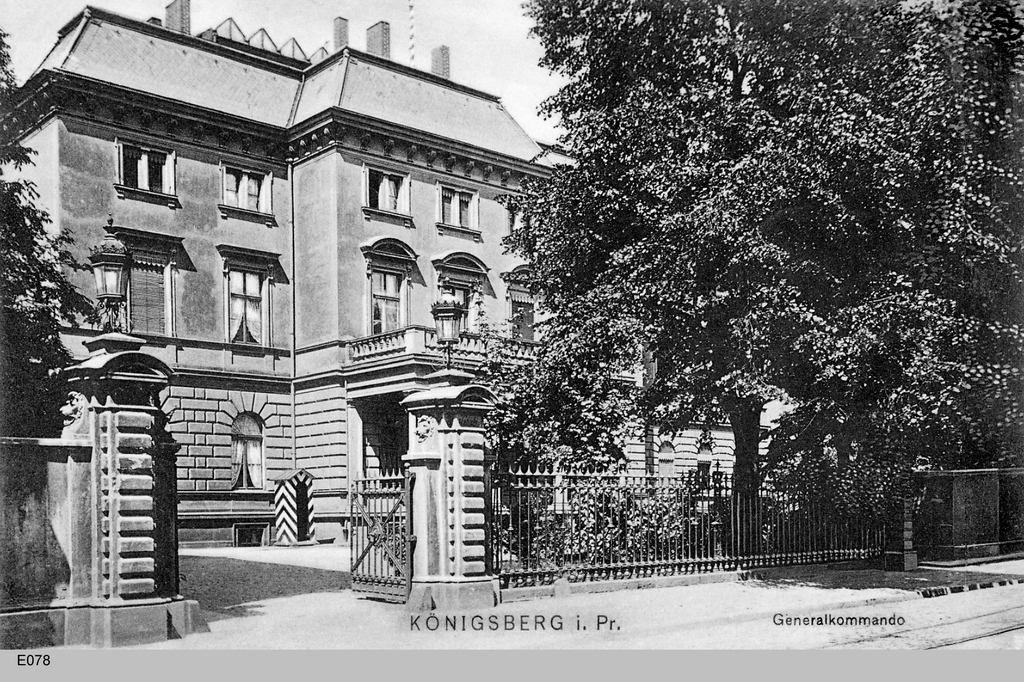
Headquarters, about 1908

From formation in 1820, the Corps commanded two divisions: 1st Division and 2nd Division. These were joined by 37th Division when it was formed on 1 April 1899. 37th Division was transferred to XX Corps when it was formed on 1 October 1912.

The 25 peacetime Corps of the German Army (Guards, I - XXI, I - III Bavarian) had a reasonably standardised organisation. Each consisted of two divisions with usually two infantry brigades, one field artillery brigade and a cavalry brigade each. Each brigade normally consisted of two regiments of the appropriate type, so each Corps normally commanded 8 infantry, 4 field artillery and 4 cavalry regiments. There were exceptions to this rule:

V, VI, VII, IX and XIV Corps each had a 5th infantry brigade (so 10 infantry regiments)
II, XIII, XVIII and XXI Corps had a 9th infantry regiment
I, VI and XVI Corps had a 3rd cavalry brigade (so 6 cavalry regiments)
the Guards Corps had 11 infantry regiments (in 5 brigades) and 8 cavalry regiments (in 4 brigades).

Each Corps also directly controlled a number of other units. This could include one or more

Foot Artillery Regiment
Jäger Battalion
Pioneer Battalion
Train Battalion

Peacetime organization of the Corps
Corps	Division	Brigade	Units	Garrison
I Corps	1st Division	1st Infantry Brigade	1st (1st East Prussian) Grenadiers "Crown Prince"	Königsberg
I Corps	1st Division	1st Infantry Brigade	41st (5th East Prussian) Infantry "von Boyen"	Tilsit, III Bn at Memel
I Corps	1st Division	2nd Infantry Brigade	3rd (2nd East Prussian) Grenadiers "King Frederick William I"	Königsberg
I Corps	1st Division	2nd Infantry Brigade	43rd (6th East Prussian) Infantry "Duke Charles of Mecklenburg"	Königsberg, II Bn at Pillau
I Corps	1st Division	1st Field Artillery Brigade	16th (1st East Prussian) Field Artillery	Königsberg
I Corps	1st Division	1st Field Artillery Brigade	52nd (2nd East Prussian) Field Artillery	Königsberg
I Corps	1st Division	1st Cavalry Brigade	3rd (East Prussian) Cuirassiers "Count Wrangel"	Königsberg
I Corps	1st Division	1st Cavalry Brigade	1st (Lithuanian) Dragoons "Prince Albrecht of Prussia"	Tilsit
I Corps	2nd Division	3rd Infantry Brigade	4th (3rd East Prussian) Grenadiers "King Frederick the Great"	Rastenburg
I Corps	2nd Division	3rd Infantry Brigade	44th (7th East Prussian) Infantry "Count Dönhoff"	Goldap
I Corps	2nd Division	4th Infantry Brigade	33rd (East Prussian) Fusiliers "Count Roon"	Gumbinnen
I Corps	2nd Division	4th Infantry Brigade	45th (8th East Prussian) Infantry	Insterburg, Darkehmen
I Corps	2nd Division	2nd Field Artillery Brigade	1st (1st Lithuanian) Field Artillery "Prince August of Prussia"	Gumbinnen, Insterburg
I Corps	2nd Division	2nd Field Artillery Brigade	37th (2nd Lithuanian) Field Artillery	Insterburg
I Corps	2nd Division	2nd Cavalry Brigade	12th (Lithuanian) Uhlans	Insterburg
I Corps	2nd Division	2nd Cavalry Brigade	9th Jäger zu Pferde	Insterburg
I Corps	2nd Division	43rd Cavalry Brigade	8th (East Prussian) Uhlans "Count zu Dohna"	Gumbinnen, Stallupönen
I Corps	2nd Division	43rd Cavalry Brigade	10th Jäger zu Pferde	Angerburg, Goldap
I Corps	Corps Troops		5th Machine Gun Abteilung	Insterburg
I Corps	Corps Troops		1st Fortress Machine Gun Abteilung	Königsberg
I Corps	Corps Troops		1st (East Prussian) Foot Artillery "von Linger"	Königsberg, Lötzen (Feste Boyen)
I Corps	Corps Troops		1st (East Prussian) Pioneer Battalion "Prince Radziwill"	Königsberg
I Corps	Corps Troops		18th (Samland) (Fortress-) Pioneer Battalion	Königsberg
I Corps	Corps Troops		5th Fortress Telephone Company	Königsberg
I Corps	Corps Troops		5th Airship Battalion	Graudenz, Königsberg, Schneidemühl
I Corps	Corps Troops		1st (East Prussian) Train Battalion	Königsberg

== World War I ==
=== Organisation on mobilisation ===
On mobilization on 2 August 1914, the Corps was restructured. The 1st and 2nd Cavalry Brigades were withdrawn to form part of the 1st Cavalry Division and the 43rd Cavalry Brigade was broken up and its regiments assigned to the divisions as reconnaissance units. The Divisions received engineer companies and other support units from the Corps headquarters. In summary, I Corps mobilised with 24 infantry battalions, 8 machine gun companies (48 machine guns), 8 cavalry squadrons, 24 field artillery batteries (144 guns), 4 heavy artillery batteries (16 guns), 3 pioneer companies and an aviation detachment.

Initial wartime organization of the Corps
Corps	Division	Brigade	Units
I Corps	1st Division	1st Infantry Brigade	1st Grenadier Regiment
I Corps	1st Division	1st Infantry Brigade	41st Infantry Regiment
I Corps	1st Division	2nd Infantry Brigade	3rd Grenadier Regiment
I Corps	1st Division	2nd Infantry Brigade	43rd Infantry Regiment
I Corps	1st Division	1st Field Artillery Brigade	16th Field Artillery Regiment
I Corps	1st Division	1st Field Artillery Brigade	52nd Field Artillery Regiment
I Corps	1st Division		8th Uhlan Regiment
I Corps	1st Division		1st Company, 1st Pioneer Battalion
I Corps	1st Division		1st Divisional Pontoon Train
I Corps	1st Division		1st Medical Company
I Corps	1st Division		3rd Medical Company
I Corps	2nd Division	3rd Infantry Brigade	4th Grenadier Regiment
I Corps	2nd Division	3rd Infantry Brigade	44th Infantry Regiment
I Corps	2nd Division	4th Infantry Brigade	33rd Fusilier Regiment
I Corps	2nd Division	4th Infantry Brigade	45th Infantry Regiment
I Corps	2nd Division	2nd Field Artillery Brigade	1st Field Artillery Regiment
I Corps	2nd Division	2nd Field Artillery Brigade	37th Field Artillery Regiment
I Corps	2nd Division		10th Jäger zu Pferde Regiment
I Corps	2nd Division		2nd Company, 1st Pioneer Battalion
I Corps	2nd Division		3rd Company, 1st Pioneer Battalion
I Corps	2nd Division		2nd Divisional Pontoon Train
I Corps	2nd Division		2nd Medical Company
I Corps	Corps Troops		I Battalion, 1st Foot Artillery Regiment
I Corps	Corps Troops		14th Aviation Detachment
I Corps	Corps Troops		1st Corps Pontoon Train
I Corps	Corps Troops		1st Telephone Detachment
I Corps	Corps Troops		1st Pioneer Searchlight Section
I Corps	Corps Troops		Munition Trains and Columns corresponding to II Corps

=== Combat chronicle ===
On mobilisation, I Corps was assigned to the 8th Army to defend East Prussia, while the rest of the Army executed the Schlieffen Plan offensive in August 1914. It saw action at the battles of Stallupönen, Gumbinnen, and Tannenberg, and the First Battle of the Masurian Lakes.

The Corps was still in existence at the end of the war.

=== 1919 ===
In 1919, as the Imperial German Army was disbanding and also transforming into the Reichswehr, the I Corps' traditions were taken over in 1921 by the 1st Division.

== Commanders ==
The I Corps had the following commanders during its existence:

From	Rank	Name
18 March 1814	General der Infanterie	Friedrich Graf Bülow von Dennewitz
5 March 1816	General der Kavallerie	Karl Ludwig von Borstell
18 June 1825	Generalleutnant	Karl August von Krafft
30 March 1832	Generalleutnant	Oldwig von Natzmer
29 November 1839	General der Kavallerie	Friedrich Graf von Wrangel
7 April 1842	General der Kavallerie	Karl Friedrich Emil zu Dohna-Schlobitten
28 March 1854	General der Infanterie	Franz Karl von Werder
29 January 1863	General der Infanterie	Adolf von Bonin
30 October 1866	General der Infanterie	Eduard Vogel von Falckenstein
4 August 1868	General der Kavallerie	Edwin Freiherr von Manteuffel
15 July 1873	General der Infanterie	Albert Freiherr von Barnekow
5 June 1883	Generalleutnant	Walther von Gottberg
1 June 1885	Generalleutnant	Christian Ewald von Kleist
15 June 1889	General der Infanterie	Paul Bronsart von Schellendorff
29 June 1891	General der Infanterie	Hans Wilhelm von Werder
10 January 1895	General der Infanterie	Karl Graf Finck von Finckenstein
27 January 1902	General der Infanterie	Colmar Freiherr von der Goltz
11 September 1907	General der Infanterie	Alexander von Kluck
1 October 1913	Generalleutnant	Hermann von François
8 October 1914	Generalleutnant	Robert Kosch
11 June 1915	General der Infanterie	Johannes von Eben
5 June 1917	General der Infanterie	Arnold von Winckler
25 February 1918	Generalleutnant	Wilhelm Groener
28 March 1918	Generalleutnant	Theodor Mengelbier
14 December 1918	General der Infanterie	Johannes von Eben
25 February 1919	Generalleutnant	Ludwig von Estorff

== See also ==
- Franco-Prussian War order of battle
- German Army order of battle (1914)
- List of Imperial German infantry regiments
- List of Imperial German artillery regiments
- List of Imperial German cavalry regiments
- Order of battle at Tannenberg

== Bibliography ==
- Cron, Hermann (2002). Imperial German Army 1914-18: Organisation, Structure, Orders-of-Battle [first published: 1937]. Helion & Co. ISBN 1-874622-70-1.
- Ellis, John; Cox, Michael (1993). The World War I Databook. Aurum Press Ltd. ISBN 1-85410-766-6.
- Haythornthwaite, Philip J. (1996). The World War One Source Book. Arms and Armour. ISBN 1-85409-351-7.
- Wegner, Günter (1993). Stellenbesetzung der deutschen Heere 1815-1939, Bd. 1. Biblio Verlag, Osnabrück.
- Histories of Two Hundred and Fifty-One Divisions of the German Army which Participated in the War (1914–1918), compiled from records of Intelligence section of the General Staff, American Expeditionary Forces, at General Headquarters, Chaumont, France 1919. The London Stamp Exchange Ltd. 1989 [1920]. ISBN 0-948130-87-3.
- The German Forces in the Field; 7th Revision, 11th November 1918; Compiled by the General Staff, War Office. Imperial War Museum, London and the Battery Press. 1995 [1918]. ISBN 978-1-870423-95-3.
