= 4th (Westphalian) Cuirassiers "von Driesen" =

Military unit

Coordinates: 51°44′43″N 8°42′38″E

The 4th (Westphalian) Cuirassiers "von Driesen" was a heavy cavalry regiment of the Royal Prussian Army. The regiment was formed in 1717. The regiment fought in the Silesian Wars, the War of the Sixth Coalition, the Austro-Prussian War, the Franco-Prussian War and World War I. The regiment was disbanded in 1919.

== See also ==
- List of Imperial German cavalry regiments
