= 8th (Rhenish) Cuirassiers "Count Geßler" =

Heavy cavalry regiment of the Royal Prussian Army

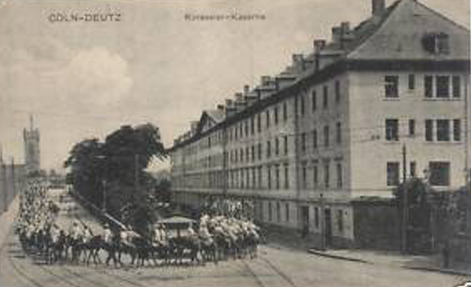

The 8th (Rhenish) Cuirassiers “Count Geßler” were a heavy cavalry regiment of the Royal Prussian Army. The regiment was formed in 1815. The regiment fought in the Austro-Prussian War, the Franco-Prussian War and World War I. The regiment was disbanded in 1919.

The British King George V was appointed Colonel-in-Chief of the Regiment in January 1902, during a visit to Berlin when he was still Prince of Wales. He served as such until the two countries declared war in 1914.

== See also ==
- List of Imperial German cavalry regiments
