= 5th (West Prussian) Cuirassiers "Duke Frederick Eugene of Württemberg" =

5th (West Prussian) Cuirassiers “Duke Frederick Eugene of Württemberg” Kürassier-Regiment „Herzog Friedrich Eugen von Württemberg“ (Westpreußisches) Nr. 5
- Active: 1717-1919
- Disbanded: 1919
- Country: Prussia, later German Empire
- Branch: Army
- Type: Heavy cavalry
- Role: Cuirassiers
- Engagements: Silesian Wars War of the Sixth Coalition; Austro-Prussian War; Franco-Prussian War World War I

The 5th (West Prussian) Cuirassiers “Duke Frederick Eugene of Württemberg” were a heavy cavalry regiment of the Royal Prussian Army. The regiment was formed in 1717. The regiment fought in the Silesian Wars, the War of the Sixth Coalition, the Austro-Prussian War, the Franco-Prussian War and World War I. It was disbanded in 1919.

== See also ==
- List of Imperial German cavalry regiments
