= 2nd Westphalian Hussar Regiment, No. 11 =

Cavalry regiment of the Prussian Army

- 2. Westfälischen-Husaren-Regiment Nr. 11
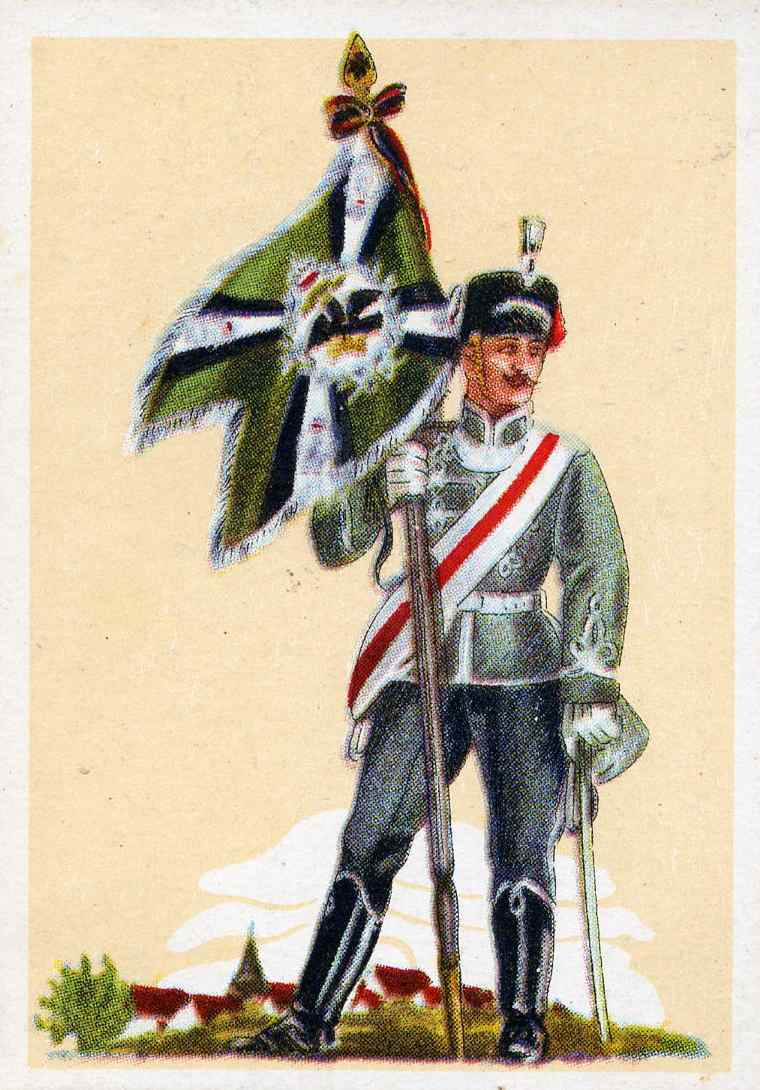
- Uniform and standard, c. 1906
- Active: 1813–1918
- Country: German Empire
- Allegiance: Prussia
- Branch: Army
- Type: Hussar
- Size: Regiment
- Nickname: "Krefeld Dancing Hussars"
- Engagements: Franco-Prussian War; World War I

Commanders
- Notable commanders: Oberst Gustav Waldemar von Rauch (1862–66)

The 2nd Westphalian Hussar Regiment, No. 11 was a cavalry unit of the Prussian Army.

== History ==
The regiment was formed on December 8, 1813, in Düsseldorf, in the newly established General Government of Berg, as the "1st Hussar Regiment" following the Wars of Liberation against Napoleon Bonaparte. It was created from the remnants of the cavalry of the former Grand Duchy of Berg. In 1860, as part of a widespread renaming of Prussian regiments, the 1st Hussar Regiment was renamed the "2nd Westphalian Hussar Regiment, No. 11."

From 1906 onwards, it was also jokingly nicknamed the "Krefeld Dancing Hussars" after relocatiing to Krefeld. In Düsseldorf, it was stationed in the Neustadt district on Neusser Strasse; a separate barracks for one squadron was built in 1893 west of Ross Strasse. In Krefeld, it was stationed in the newly constructed barracks on what is now Westparkstrasse.

== See also ==
- List of Imperial German cavalry regiments
