= 7th Mounted Rifles =

Military unit

The 7th Mounted Rifles were a light cavalry regiment of the Royal Prussian Army. The regiment was formed 1 October 1913 in Trier.

== See also ==
- List of Imperial German cavalry regiments
