= 8th Mounted Rifles =

Military unit

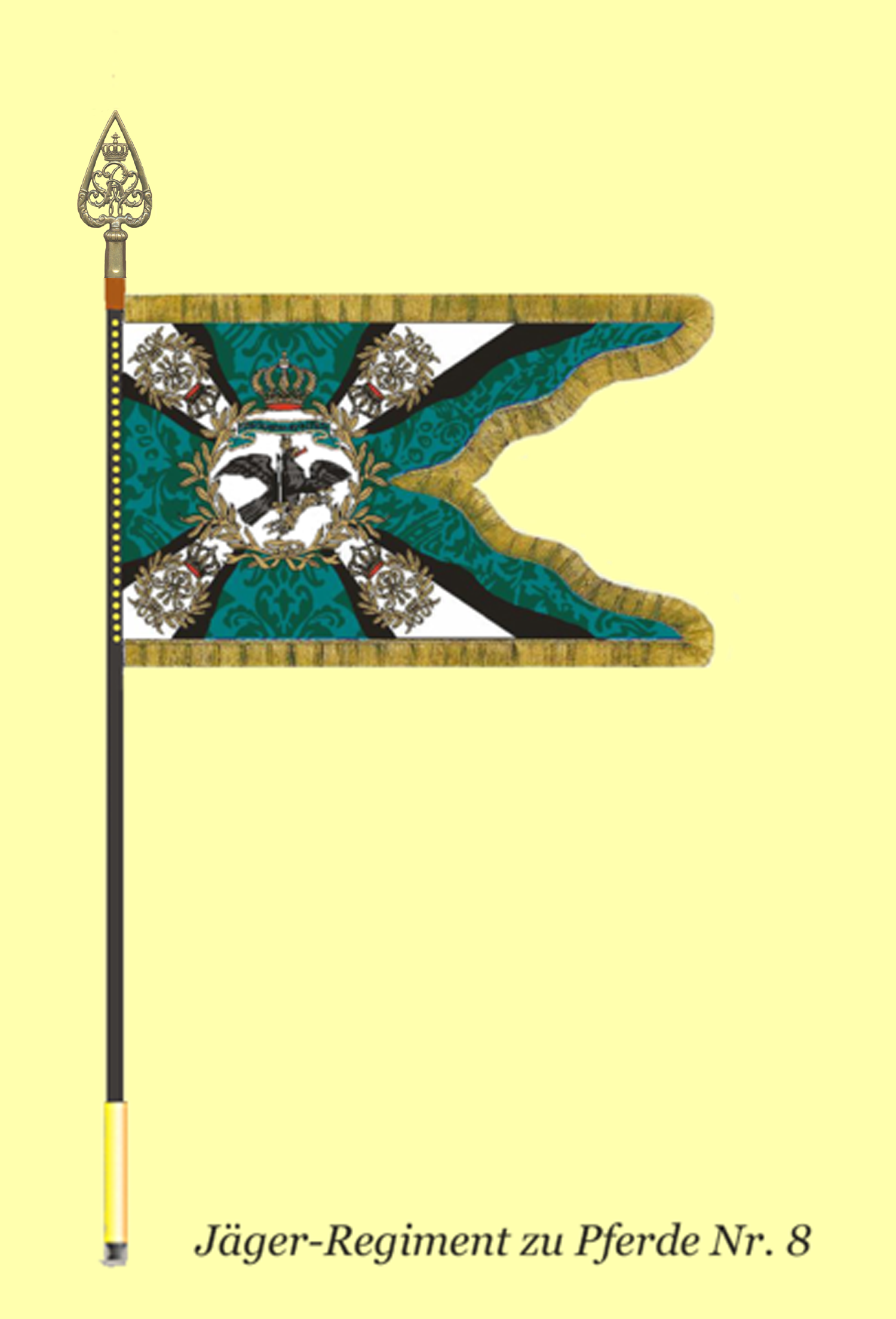
Colors of the royal prussian 8th Regiment of Mounted Rifles.

The 8th Mounted Rifles were a light cavalry regiment of the Royal Prussian Army. The regiment was formed 1 October 1913 in Trier.

== See also ==
- List of Imperial German cavalry regiments
