= German cavalry in World War I =

German Cavalry
- Active: 1914–19
- Disbanded: 1919
- Country: German Empire
- Allegiance: German Emperor
- Branch: Imperial German Army
- Type: Cavalry
- Engagements: World War I

The history of the German Cavalry in World War I is one of an arm in decline.

== Pre-war ==
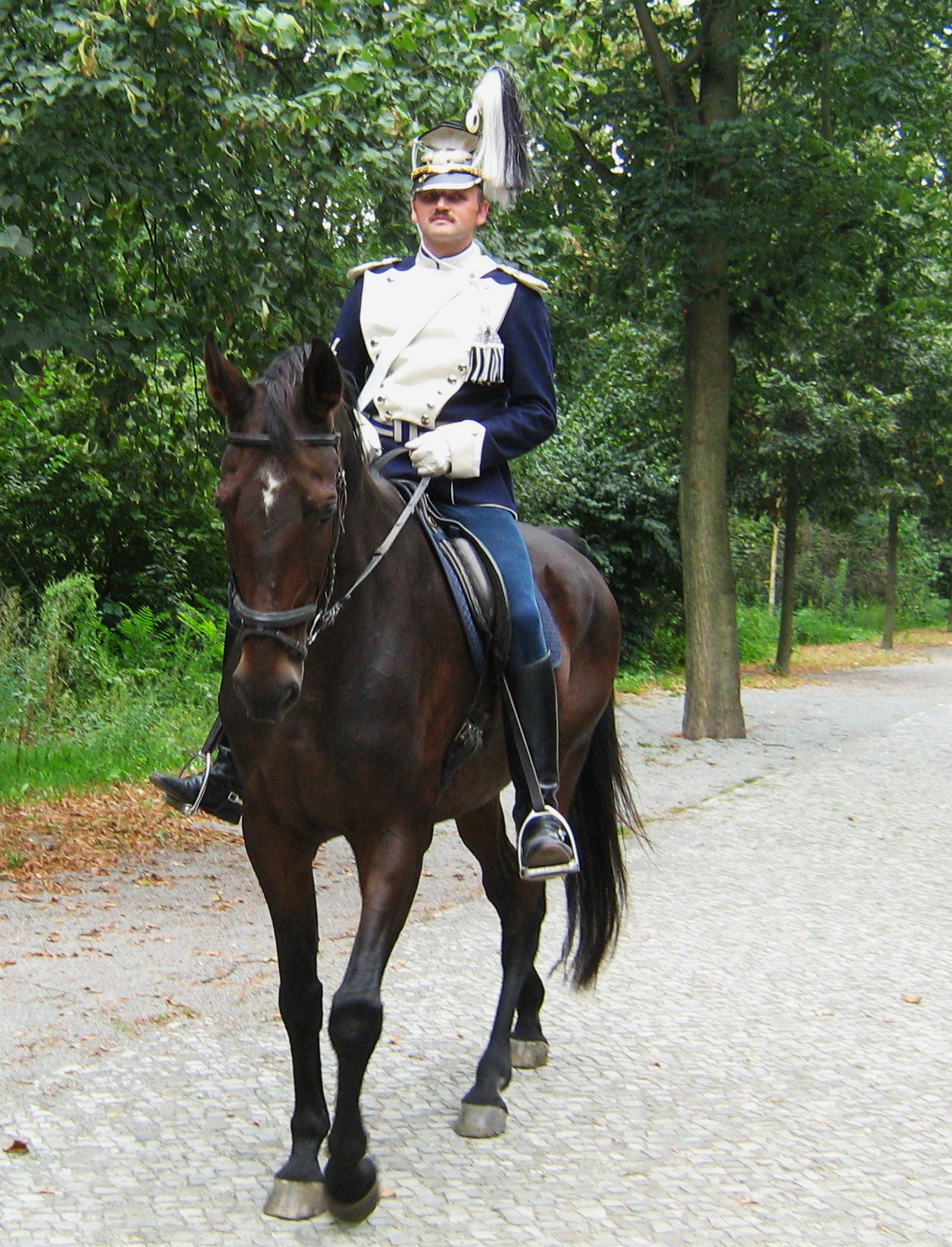
German Army cavalry re-enactment

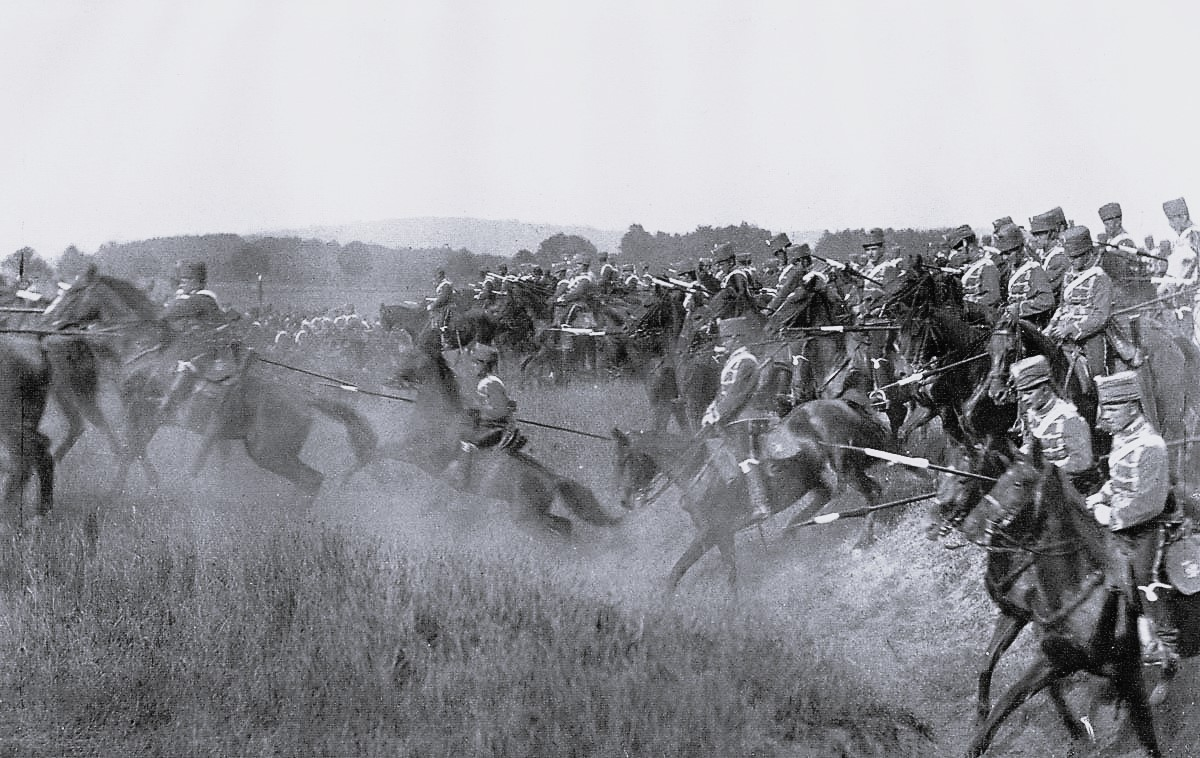
German Army hussars on the attack during maneuvers, 1912

The peacetime Imperial German Army was organised as 25 Corps (Guards, I - XXI and I - III Bavarian) each of two divisions (1st and 2nd Guards, 1st - 42nd and 1st - 6th Bavarian). Each division included a cavalry brigade (of two regiments) numbered as their parent division with the following exceptions:

- The Guards Corps had four cavalry brigades organised as the Guards Cavalry Division, the only peacetime cavalry division in the Army
- The Leib Hussar Brigade was assigned to 36th Division and there was no 36th Cavalry Brigade
- Three corps had an extra cavalry brigade:
  - 43rd Cavalry Brigade attached to 2nd Division of I Corps
  - 44th Cavalry Brigade attached to 12th Division of VI Corps
  - 45th Cavalry Brigade attached to 34th Division of XVI Corps

This gave a total of 55 brigades and 110 regiments.

Pre-war regimental assignments
Brigade	Peacetime Corps	Peacetime Division	Regiment	Regiment
1st Guards Cavalry	Guards Corps	Guards Cavalry Division	Garde du Corps	Guards Cuirassiers
2nd Guards Cavalry	Guards Corps	Guards Cavalry Division	1st Guards Uhlans	3rd Guards Uhlans
3rd Guards Cavalry	Guards Corps	Guards Cavalry Division	1st Guards Dragoons	2nd Guards Dragoons
4th Guards Cavalry	Guards Corps	Guards Cavalry Division	Guards Hussars	2nd Guards Uhlans
1st Cavalry	I Corps	1st Division	3rd Cuirassiers	1st Dragoons
2nd Cavalry	I Corps	2nd Division	12th Uhlans	9th Jäger zu Pferde
3rd Cavalry	II Corps	3rd Division	2nd Cuirassiers	9th Uhlans
4th Cavalry	II Corps	4th Division	3rd Grenadiers zu Pferde	12th Dragoons
5th Cavalry	III Corps	5th Division	2nd Dragoons	3rd Uhlans
6th Cavalry	III Corps	6th Division	6th Cuirassiers	3rd Hussars
7th Cavalry	IV Corps	7th Division	10th Hussars	16th Uhlans
8th Cavalry	IV Corps	8th Division	7th Cuirassiers	12th Hussars
9th Cavalry	V Corps	9th Division	4th Dragoons	10th Uhlans
10th Cavalry	V Corps	10th Division	1st Uhlans	1st Jäger zu Pferde
11th Cavalry	VI Corps	11th Division	1st Leib Cuirassiers	8th Dragoons
12th Cavalry	VI Corps	12th Division	4th Hussars	6th Hussars
13th Cavalry	VII Corps	13th Division	4th Cuirassiers	8th Hussars
14th Cavalry	VII Corps	14th Division	11th Hussars	5th Uhlans
15th Cavalry	VIII Corps	15th Division	8th Cuirassiers	7th Hussars
16th Cavalry	VIII Corps	16th Division	7th Jäger zu Pferde	8th Jäger zu Pferde
17th Cavalry	IX Corps	17th Division	17th Dragoons	18th Dragoons
18th Cavalry	IX Corps	18th Division	15th Hussars	16th Hussars
19th Cavalry	X Corps	19th Division	19th Dragoons	13th Uhlans
20th Cavalry	X Corps	20th Division	16th Dragoons	17th Hussars
21st Cavalry	XVIII Corps	21st Division	6th Dragoons	6th Uhlans
22nd Cavalry	XI Corps	22nd Division	5th Dragoons	14th Hussars
23rd Cavalry	XII Corps	23rd Division	Saxon Heavy Cavalry	17th Uhlans
24th Cavalry	XIX Corps	24th Division	19th Hussars	18th Uhlans
25th Cavalry	XVIII Corps	25th Division	23rd Guard Dragoons	24th Leib Dragoons
26th Cavalry	XIII Corps	26th Division	25th Dragoons	26th Dragoons
27th Cavalry	XIII Corps	27th Division	19th Uhlans	20th Uhlans
28th Cavalry	XIV Corps	28th Division	20th Leib Dragoons	21st Dragoons
29th Cavalry	XIV Corps	29th Division	22nd Dragoons	5th Jäger zu Pferde
30th Cavalry	XV Corps	30th Division	15th Dragoons	9th Hussars
31st Cavalry	XXI Corps	31st Division	7th Dragoons	7th Uhlans
32nd Cavalry	XII Corps	32nd Division	18th Hussars	20th Hussars
33rd Cavalry	XVI Corps	33rd Division	9th Dragoons	13th Dragoons
34th Cavalry	XVI Corps	34th Division	14th Uhlans	12th Jäger zu Pferde
35th Cavalry	XVII Corps	35th Division	5th Hussars	4th Jäger zu Pferde
Leib Hussar	XVII Corps	36th Division	1st Leib Hussars	2nd Leib Hussars
37th Cavalry	XX Corps	37th Division	10th Dragoons	11th Dragoons
38th Cavalry	XI Corps	38th Division	2nd Jäger zu Pferde	6th Jäger zu Pferde
39th Cavalry	XV Corps	39th Division	14th Dragoons	3rd Jäger zu Pferde
40th Cavalry	XIX Corps	40th Division	Saxon Carabiniers	21st Uhlans
41st Cavalry	XX Corps	41st Division	5th Cuirassiers	4th Uhlans
42nd Cavalry	XXI Corps	42nd Division	11th Uhlans	15th Uhlans
43rd Cavalry	I Corps	2nd Division	8th Uhlans	10th Jäger zu Pferde
44th Cavalry	VI Corps	12th Division	2nd Uhlans	11th Jäger zu Pferde
45th Cavalry	XVI Corps	34th Division	13th Hussars	13th Jäger zu Pferde
1st Bavarian Cavalry	I Bavarian Corps	1st Bavarian Division	1st Bavarian Heavy Cavalry	2nd Bavarian Heavy Cavalry
2nd Bavarian Cavalry	I Bavarian Corps	2nd Bavarian Division	4th Bavarian Chevaulégers	8th Bavarian Chevaulégers
3rd Bavarian Cavalry	II Bavarian Corps	3rd Bavarian Division	3rd Bavarian Chevaulégers	5th Bavarian Chevaulégers
4th Bavarian Cavalry	II Bavarian Corps	4th Bavarian Division	1st Bavarian Uhlans	2nd Bavarian Uhlans
5th Bavarian Cavalry	III Bavarian Corps	5th Bavarian Division	1st Bavarian Chevaulégers	6th Bavarian Chevaulégers
6th Bavarian Cavalry	III Bavarian Corps	6th Bavarian Division	2nd Bavarian Chevaulégers	7th Bavarian Chevaulégers

A complete list of the pre-war regiments, their peacetime corps assignments and garrisons is shown here.

== Mobilisation ==
On mobilisation, the pre-war cavalry brigades were withdrawn from their divisions (as detailed below). 33 brigades (66 regiments) were used to form the 11 cavalry divisions. The remaining 22 brigades (44 regiments) were broken up and their regiments were employed as divisional cavalry for the 50 active divisions. This necessitated 6 regiments being raised to a strength of 6 squadrons before being split into two half-regiments of 3 squadrons each. The regiments involved were:

- 3rd Hussars assigned as divisional cavalry to 5th & 6th Divisions of III Corps
- 10th Hussars assigned as divisional cavalry to 7th & 8th Divisions of IV Corps
- 16th Uhlans assigned as divisional cavalry to 13th & 14th Divisions of VII Corps
- 16th Dragoons assigned as divisional cavalry to 17th & 18th Divisions of IX Corps
- 17th Hussars assigned as divisional cavalry to 19th & 20th Divisions of X Corps
- 6th Cuirassiers assigned as divisional cavalry to 22nd & 38th Divisions of XI Corps

The other active regiments had a strength of 4 squadrons.

33 Reserve Cavalry Regiments, 2 Landwehr Cavalry Regiments and an Ersatz Cavalry Regiment were also formed and assigned to field formations. Each of these had a strength of 3 squadrons. Finally, there were 38 Landwehr squadrons (assigned to the mixed Landwehr brigades) and 19 Ersatz detachments (assigned to the mixed Ersatz brigades).

Reserve, Landwehr and Ersatz Regiments raised on mobilisation
Regiment	Raised by	Divisional assignment	Corps assignment.
Reserve Guards Uhlans	Guards Corps	3rd Guards Division	Guards Reserve Corps
Reserve Guards Dragoons	Guards Corps	1st Guards Reserve Division	Guards Reserve Corps
1st Reserve Uhlans	I Corps	1st Reserve Division	I Reserve Corps
1st Reserve Hussars	XVII Corps	36th Reserve Division	I Reserve Corps
2nd Reserve Dragoons	III Corps	5th Reserve Division	III Reserve Corps
3rd Reserve Uhlans	III Corps	6th Reserve Division	III Reserve Corps
1st Reserve Schwere Reiter	IV Corps	7th Reserve Division	IV Reserve Corps
1st Reserve Jager zu Pferde	XI Corps	22nd Reserve Division	IV Reserve Corps
3rd Reserve Dragoons	V Corps	9th Reserve Division	V Reserve Corps
6th Reserve Uhlans	V Corps	10th Reserve Division	V Reserve Corps
4th Reserve Hussars	VI Corps	11th Reserve Division	VI Reserve Corps
4th Reserve Uhlans	VI Corps	12th Reserve Division	VI Reserve Corps
5th Reserve Hussars	VII Corps	13th Reserve Division	VII Reserve Corps
8th Reserve Hussars	VII Corps	14th Reserve Division	VII Reserve Corps
5th Reserve Uhlans	X Corps	15th Reserve Division	VIII Reserve Corps
2nd Reserve Schwere Reiter	VIII Corps	16th Reserve Division	VIII Reserve Corps
6th Reserve Hussars	IX Corps	17th Reserve Division	IX Reserve Corps
7th Reserve Hussars	IX Corps	18th Reserve Division	IX Reserve Corps
2nd Reserve Uhlans	II Corps	2nd Guards Reserve Division	X Reserve Corps
6th Reserve Dragoons	X Corps	19th Reserve Division	X Reserve Corps
Reserve Saxon Hussars	XII Corps	23rd Reserve Division	XII Reserve Corps
Reserve Saxon Uhlans	XIX Corps	24th Reserve Division	XII Reserve Corps
Reserve Wurttenberg Dragoons	XIII Corps	26th Reserve Division	XIV Reserve Corps
8th Reserve Dragoons	XIV Corps	28th Reserve Division	XIV Reserve Corps
7th Reserve Dragoons	XI Corps	21st Reserve Division	XVIII Reserve Corps
4th Reserve Dragoons	XVIII Corps	25th Reserve Division	XVIII Reserve Corps
1st Reserve Bavarian	I Bavarian Corps	1st Bavarian Reserve Division	I Bavarian Reserve Corps
5th Reserve Bavarian	III Bavarian Corps	5th Bavarian Reserve Division	I Bavarian Reserve Corps
5th Reserve Dragoons	II Corps	3rd Reserve Division	Directly subordinated to 8th Army
9th Reserve Hussars	III Corps	30th Reserve Division	Fortress Strassburg
2nd Reserve Hussars	IV Corps	33rd Reserve Division	Fortress Metz
3rd Reserve Schwere Reiter	XX Corps	35th Reserve Division	Fortress Thorn
1st Reserve Dragoons	XX Corps	n/a	Fortress Königsberg
1st Landwehr Cavalry	V Corps	3rd Landwehr Division	Landwehr Corps
2nd Landwehr Cavalry	VI Corps	4th Landwehr Division	Landwehr Corps
Ersatz Cavalry	VI Corps	4th Landwehr Division	Landwehr Corps

== Regiments ==
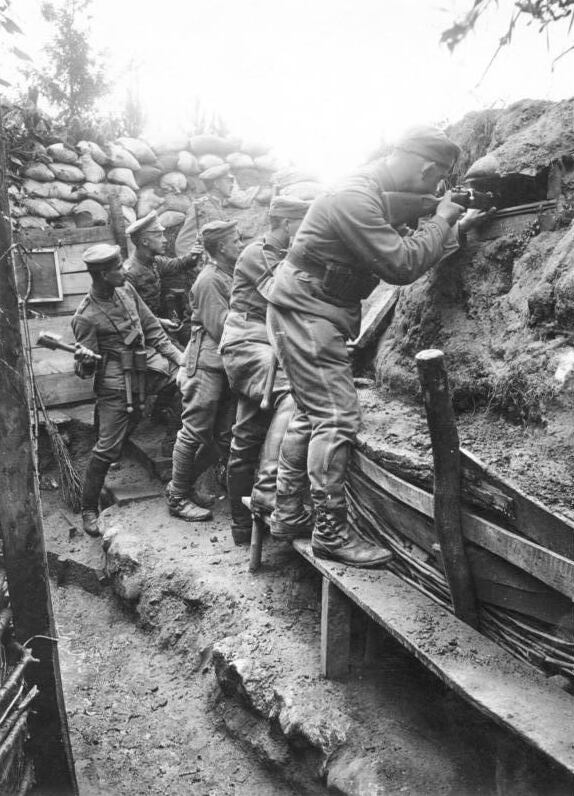
German cavalry of the 11th Reserve Hussar Regiment in a trench in France in 1916

The 110 active regiments were assigned to the Field Army on mobilisation. Each regiment formed a depot squadron which remained in Germany and took 4 squadrons into the field. 6 regiments were brought up to a strength of 6 squadrons and split into two half regiments; they joined the two divisions of their Corps. 33 Reserve Regiments, 2 Landwehr Regiments and 1 Ersatz Regiment also joined the Field Army, but were only at a strength of 3 squadrons.

Establishment of each regiment
Squadrons	Officers	NCOs and other ranks	riding horses	draught horses	bridge wagons	telephone wagons	medical wagons	baggage wagons	supply wagons	fodder wagons
4	36	688	709	60	2	1	1	5	5	5
6	51	1017	1057	76	2	1	0	7	7	7
3	27	511	532	36	0	0	0	4	4	4

=== Cavalry Divisions ===
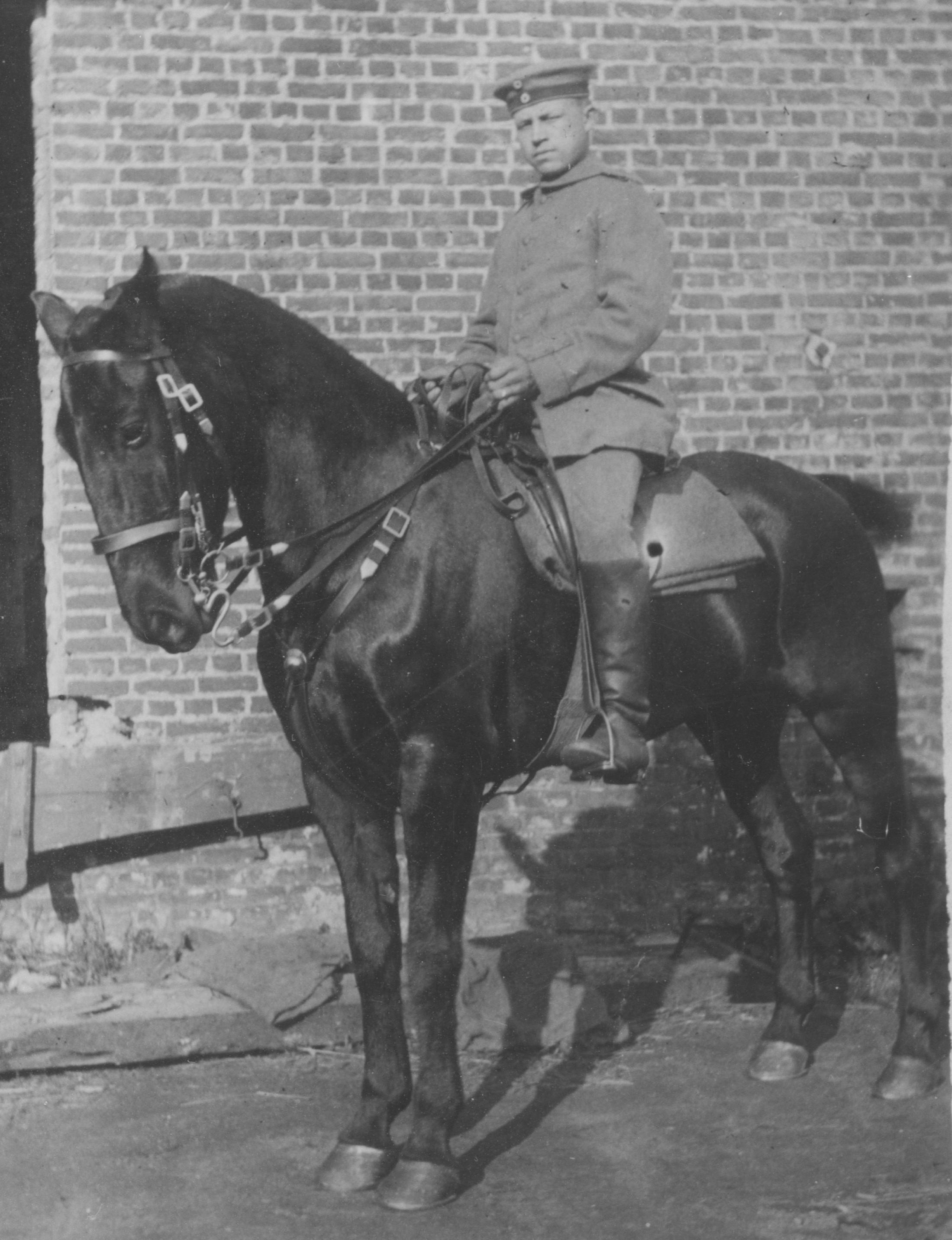
Soldier of the Grenadier-Regiment "König Friedrich Wilhelm I." (2. Ostpreußisches) Nr. 3 in Königsberg during equestrian training

In September 1916, the establishment of cavalry regiments within the Cavalry Divisions was reduced to 675 horses instead of 769. The Supreme Command did not stop there, but also took away the horses of entire regiments and used them as infantry. These regiments were redesignated as Cavalry Schützen Regiments (as detailed below). By the end of the war, just 22 Cavalry Regiments remained mounted, a fifth of the active regiments mobilised in 1914.

=== Divisional Cavalry ===
A measure was put into force through the War Ministry at the beginning of August 1916 whereby every division and autonomous brigade in the Army of the West was to command just one squadron of cavalry. The measure also came into force immediately in the Army of the East. The Landwehr and Ersatz formations, together with the individual squadrons and Reserve Detachments set up during the war for the new divisions were dissolved.

For the cavalry regiments allocated as individual squadrons to the divisions, the regimental unit ceased to exist for all practical purposes. The Regimental Staffs were not dissolved, but were for the most part left with the divisions they happened to find themselves with, to be used for special purposes. 16 Regimental Commanders found new employment as horse inspectors; two Regimental Staffs were changed into Infantry Regiment Staffs; and three Regimental Staffs were changed into Jäger Regiment Staffs.

By the end of war, about 250 individual mounted squadrons remained, representing 61 active and 22 reserve cavalry regiments.

=== Nomenclature ===
Although the various regiments were divided into a number of different categories (cuirassiers, dragoons, hussars, uhlans, etc.) all had the same role. Regiments bore a number within its category, a state (or province in the case of Prussian regiments) and usually an honour title. For example,

- 6th (Brandenburg) Cuirassiers "Emperor Nicholas I of Russia" was the 6th regiment of cuirassiers, from the Prussian Province of Brandenburg and named for Tsar Nicholas I of Russia
- 26th (2nd Württemberg) Dragoons "King" was the 26th regiment of dragoons, the 2nd one drawn from the Kingdom of Württemberg
- 21st (3rd Royal Saxon) Uhlans was the 21st regiment of uhlans (lancers) and the 3rd from the Kingdom of Saxony

Bavarian regiments were numbered in a separate sequence, so 1st Royal Bavarian Uhlans "Emperor William II, King of Prussia" was distinct from 1st (West Prussian) Uhlans "Emperor Alexander III of Russia"

Uniquely amongst cavalry regiments, the 7th Dragoon Regiment was awarded an honour title during the war (on 23 September 1917) and was thereafter

- 7th (Westphalian) Dragoons "Generalfeldmarschall Prince Leopold of Bavaria".

== Brigades ==
33 pre-war brigades were used to form the 11 cavalry divisions. The remaining 22 brigades were broken up (only the 39th Cavalry Brigade was reconstituted) and their regiments were used to form the divisional cavalry for the 50 pre-war infantry divisions. Other than these, only a handful of other Cavalry Brigades were formed:

- Provisional Guards Cavalry Brigade operated in the East from 5 January 1915 to 12 November 1916
- Siebenbürg Cavalry Brigade formed for the Romanian Campaign out of the remnants of the dissolved 3rd Cavalry Division, later renamed 7th Bavarian Cavalry Brigade
- 4th Landwehr Cavalry Brigade as the 4th Landwehr Division was the only division to mobilise with two cavalry regiments

All other Cavalry Brigades named for their commanders were temporary formations and merely consisted of reinforced cavalry regiments, for example Cavalry Brigade Kaufmann under the Staff of 6th Uhlans.

By the end of the war, just 10 cavalry brigades remained as mounted formations:

- 2nd Cavalry Brigade with 1st Cavalry Division
- 17th Cavalry Brigade autonomous in the East
- 22nd Cavalry Brigade with 2nd Cavalry Division
- 23rd Cavalry Brigade autonomous in the East
- 25th Cavalry Brigade with 2nd Cavalry Division
- Leib Hussar Brigade autonomous in the East
- 1st Bavarian Cavalry Brigade with Bavarian Cavalry Division
- 4th Bavarian Cavalry Brigade autonomous in the East
- 5th Bavarian Cavalry Brigade with Bavarian Cavalry Division
- 7th Bavarian Cavalry Brigade autonomous in the Caucasus

The rest had been dissolved, converted to Cavalry Schützen Commands, or formed mixed units in Russia and Ukraine.

War service of Cavalry Brigades
Brigade	War service
1st Guards Cavalry	On mobilisation, assigned to Guards Cavalry Division; 9 April 1917 became independent.
2nd Guards Cavalry	On mobilisation, assigned to Guards Cavalry Division; 6 June 1916 became independent.
3rd Guards Cavalry	On mobilisation, assigned to Guards Cavalry Division; 18 October 1916 became independent.
4th Guards Cavalry	Brigade dissolved on mobilisation; Life Guards Hussars assigned as divisional cavalry to 1st Guards Division and 2nd Guards Uhlans to 2nd Guards Division.
Provisional Guards Cavalry	Formed by 2nd Cavalry Division on 5 January 1915; 15 January 1915 became independent; 12 November 1916 dissolved.
1st Cavalry	On mobilisation, assigned to 1st Cavalry Division; 3 October 1916 became independent; 13 October to 1 November 1916 Brigade Staff joined 3rd Cavalry Division; 2 November 1916 renamed Siebenbürg Cavalry Brigade.
2nd Cavalry	On mobilisation, assigned to 1st Cavalry Division and remained with the division throughout.
3rd Cavalry	On mobilisation, assigned to 4th Cavalry Division; 30 November 1914 became independent; 17 October 1916 joined 6th Cavalry Division; 6 May 1918 renamed Cavalry Schützen Command 3.
4th Cavalry	Brigade dissolved on mobilisation; 3rd Grenadiers zu Pferde assigned as divisional cavalry to 3rd Division and 12th Dragoons to 4th Division.
5th Cavalry	On mobilisation, assigned to 2nd Cavalry Division; 8 August 1916 became independent; 19 October 1916 joined 6th Cavalry Division; 11 May 1918 renamed Cavalry Schützen Command 5.
6th Cavalry	Brigade dissolved on mobilisation; 6th Cuirassiers assigned as divisional cavalry to 22nd & 38th Divisions and 3rd Hussars to 5th & 6th Divisions.
7th Cavalry	Brigade dissolved on mobilisation; 10th Hussars assigned as divisional cavalry to 7th & 8th Divisions and 16th Uhlans to 13th & 14th Divisions.
8th Cavalry	On mobilisation, assigned to 2nd Cavalry Division; 25 July 1916 joined 1st Cavalry Division; 18 October 1916 joined 6th Cavalry Division; 6 October 1917 became independent.
9th Cavalry	On mobilisation, assigned to 5th Cavalry Division; 26 December 1916 became independent.
10th Cavalry	Brigade dissolved on mobilisation; 1st Uhlans assigned as divisional cavalry to 9th Division and 1st Jäger zu Pferde to 10th Division.
11th Cavalry	On mobilisation, assigned to 5th Cavalry Division; 23 March 1918 joined Guards Cavalry Division; 8 May 1918 renamed Cavalry Schützen Command 11.
12th Cavalry	On mobilisation, assigned to 5th Cavalry Division; 20 February 1918 became independent.
13th Cavalry	On mobilisation, assigned to 9th Cavalry Division; 8 February 1916, Brigade Staff renamed Cavalry Inspector for the Warsaw General Government; 13 December 1916 joined the Staff of the Quartermaster-General as Representative for Equine Affairs.
14th Cavalry	On mobilisation, assigned to 9th Cavalry Division; 23 February 1918 joined Guards Cavalry Division; 8 May 1918 renamed Cavalry Schützen Command 14.
15th Cavalry	Brigade dissolved on mobilisation; 8th Cuirassiers assigned as divisional cavalry to 15th Division and 7th Hussars to 16th Division.
16th Cavalry	On mobilisation, assigned to 3rd Cavalry Division; 1 September 1916 became independent.
17th Cavalry	On mobilisation, assigned to 4th Cavalry Division; 1 February 1917 became independent. Remained as a mounted unit to the end of the war (in the East).
18th Cavalry	On mobilisation, assigned to 4th Cavalry Division; 12 December 1916 joined 1st Cavalry Division; 15 October 1918 absorbed into XXXXI Reserve Corps.
19th Cavalry	On mobilisation, assigned to 9th Cavalry Division; 8 April 1917 joined Guards Cavalry Division; 12 February 1918 became independent.
20th Cavalry	Brigade dissolved on mobilisation; 16th Dragoons assigned as divisional cavalry to 17th & 18th Divisions and 17th Hussars to 19th & 20th Divisions.
21st Cavalry	Brigade dissolved on mobilisation; 6th Dragoons assigned as divisional cavalry to 25th Division and 6th Uhlans to 21st Division.
22nd Cavalry	On mobilisation, assigned to 3rd Cavalry Division; 13 August 1916 joined 2nd Cavalry Division.
23rd Cavalry	On mobilisation, assigned to 8th Cavalry Division; 1 February 1917 joined 1st Cavalry Division; 22 October 1917 became independent. Remained as a mounted unit to the end of the war (in the East).
24th Cavalry	Brigade dissolved on mobilisation; 19th Hussars assigned as divisional cavalry to 40th Division and 18th Uhlans to 24th Division.
25th Cavalry	On mobilisation, assigned to 3rd Cavalry Division; 23 September 1916 joined 2nd Cavalry Division.
26th Cavalry	On mobilisation, assigned to 7th Cavalry Division; 6 October 1917 became independent.
27th Cavalry	Brigade dissolved on mobilisation; 19th Uhlans assigned as divisional cavalry to 27th Division and 20th Uhlans to 26th Division.
28th Cavalry	On mobilisation, assigned to 6th Cavalry Division; 1 February 1917 joined 4th Cavalry Division; 17 May 1918 joined 7th Cavalry Division; 27 May 1918 renamed Cavalry Schützen Command 28.
29th Cavalry	Brigade dissolved on mobilisation; 22nd Dragoons assigned as divisional cavalry to 29th Division and 5th Jäger zu Pferde to 28th Division.
30th Cavalry	On mobilisation, assigned to 7th Cavalry Division; 27 May 1918 renamed Cavalry Schützen Command 30.
31st Cavalry	Brigade dissolved on mobilisation; 7th Dragoons assigned as divisional cavalry to 42nd Division and 7th Uhlans to 31st Division.
32nd Cavalry	Brigade dissolved on mobilisation; 18th Hussars assigned as divisional cavalry to 23rd Division and 20th Hussars to 32nd Division.
33rd Cavalry	On mobilisation, assigned to 6th Cavalry Division; 14 September 1916 became independent.
34th Cavalry	Brigade dissolved on mobilisation; 14th Uhlans assigned as divisional cavalry to 34th Division and 12th Jäger zu Pferde to 33rd Division.
35th Cavalry	Brigade dissolved on mobilisation; 5th Hussars assigned as divisional cavalry to 36th Division and 4th Jäger zu Pferde to 35th Division.
Leib Hussar	On mobilisation, assigned to 2nd Cavalry Division; became independent on 20 August 1916. Remained as a mounted unit to the end of the war (in the East).
37th Cavalry	Brigade dissolved on mobilisation; 10th Dragoons assigned as divisional cavalry to 37th Division and 11th Dragoons to 41st Division.
38th Cavalry	On mobilisation, assigned to 8th Cavalry Division; 20 April 1918 joined Guards Cavalry Division; 8 May 1918 renamed Cavalry Schützen Command 38.
39th Cavalry	Brigade dissolved on mobilisation; 14th Dragoons assigned as divisional cavalry to 39th Division and 3rd Jäger zu Pferde to 30th Division; 28 September 1914 reconstituted and joined 4th Cavalry Division; 1 February 1917 transferred to 8th Cavalry Division; 6 April 1918 rejoined 4th Cavalry Division.
40th Cavalry	On mobilisation, assigned to 8th Cavalry Division; 10 April 1918 dissolved.
41st Cavalry	On mobilisation, assigned to 1st Cavalry Division; 17 October 1916 joined 7th Cavalry Division; 27 May 1918 renamed Cavalry Schützen Command 41.
42nd Cavalry	On mobilisation, assigned to 7th Cavalry Division; 14 September 1916 became independent.
43rd Cavalry	Brigade dissolved on mobilisation; 8th Uhlans assigned as divisional cavalry to 1st Division and 10th Jäger zu Pferde to 2nd Division.
44th Cavalry	Brigade dissolved on mobilisation; 2nd Uhlans assigned as divisional cavalry to 12th Division and 11th Jäger zu Pferde to 11th Division.
45th Cavalry	On mobilisation, assigned to 6th Cavalry Division; 14 October 1916 became independent; 1 February 1917 joined 4th Cavalry Division; 1 May 1918 rejoined 6th Cavalry Division; 6 May 1918 renamed Cavalry Schützen Command 45.
1st Bavarian Cavalry	On mobilisation, assigned to Bavarian Cavalry Division and remained with the division throughout.
2nd Bavarian Cavalry	Brigade dissolved on mobilisation; 4th Bavarian Chevaulégers assigned as divisional cavalry to 2nd Bavarian Division and 8th Bavarian Chevaulégers to 1st Bavarian Division.
3rd Bavarian Cavalry	Brigade dissolved on mobilisation; 3rd Bavarian Chevaulégers assigned as divisional cavalry to 3rd Bavarian Division and 5th Bavarian Chevaulégers to 4th Bavarian Division.
4th Bavarian Cavalry	On mobilisation, assigned to Bavarian Cavalry Division; 3 July 1917 became independent. Remained as a mounted unit to the end of the war (in the East).
5th Bavarian Cavalry	On mobilisation, assigned to Bavarian Cavalry Division and remained with the division throughout.
6th Bavarian Cavalry	Brigade dissolved on mobilisation; 2nd Bavarian Chevaulégers assigned as divisional cavalry to 6th Bavarian Division and 7th Bavarian Chevaulégers to 5th Bavarian Division.
7th Bavarian Cavalry	1 June 1917 renamed from Siebenbürg Cavalry Brigade; joined 2nd Cavalry Division at some point; 18 February 1918 became independent. Remained as a mounted unit to the end of the war (in the Caucasus).
Siebenbürg Cavalry	2 November 1916 Staff renamed from 1st Cavalry Brigade, remained attached to 3rd Cavalry Division to 31 May 1917; 1 June 1917 became independent and renamed 7th Bavarian Cavalry Brigade.
4th Landwehr Cavalry	Established at the end of September 1914 with the 4th Landwehr Division; 1 October 1916 dissolved. Brigade Staff became the Staff of 215th Infantry Brigade.

== Divisions ==
The German Army constituted 11 cavalry divisions at the outbreak of war - the existing Guards Cavalry Division and 10 more formed on mobilisation. Each consisted of 3 cavalry brigades (6 regiments each of 4 squadrons), a horse artillery Abteilung (3 four-gun batteries), a machine gun detachment (company size, 6 MGs), plus pioneers, signals and a motor vehicle column. A more detailed Table of Organisation and Equipment can be seen here.

Apart from the opening actions of the war, the use of these divisions as proper cavalry was only possible in the offensive in Courland and on Vilna in 1915, for a short time in Romania, and in 1918 in support of Ukraine. Most of the time they were used as infantry.

The increasing shortage of horses led to the 4th, 5th and 9th Cavalry Divisions being dismounted in October 1916. The 3rd Cavalry Division was dissolved in November 1916 and the 6th and 7th Cavalry Divisions were also dismounted in November 1917. The Guards Cavalry Division followed in March 1918.

The dismounted divisions were converted to Cavalry Schützen Divisions. Here, the cavalry brigades were renamed Cavalry Schützen Commands and performed a similar role to that of an infantry regiment command. Likewise, the cavalry regiments became Cavalry Schützen Regiments and allotted the role of an infantry battalion and their squadrons acted as infantry companies. However, these units were much weaker than normal infantry formations (for example, a Schützen squadron had a strength of just 4 officers and 109 NCOs and other ranks, considerably less than that of an infantry company). However, the 5th, 8th and 9th Cavalry Divisions were dissolved before conversion to Schützen.

By the end of the war, there were only 3 Cavalry Divisions in the East (1st, 2nd and Bavarian with just 5 brigades between them) and 4 Schützen Divisions in the West (Guards, 4th, 6th and 7th though the 4th was more akin to a Landwehr Division).

War service of Cavalry Divisions
Division	Formed	Combat Chronicle	Fate
Guards Cavalry	pre-war	On the Western Front until December 1914, then frontier guard duties against the Netherlands until 30 June 1915, then to Russia. From 16 March 1918 to 9 April 1918 dismounted, re-formation and training on the Zossen troop training ground. Thereafter, Guards Cavalry Schützen Division on the Western Front. In Artois to May 1918, then Champagne / Aisne.	Schützen Division disbanded post-war
1st Cavalry	on mobilisation	Remained in the East throughout the war. 6 January 1915 to 22 August 1917, Coastal Defence duties in northern Courland. To Ukraine in March 1918 (until 29 January 1919). From 16 January 1918 it contained just one brigade of 3 regiments.	disbanded post-war
2nd Cavalry	on mobilisation	On the Western Front. From 12 November 1914 transferred to Russia until 25 November 1916; in Romania until December 1916; then back to the West. Frontier Guard on the Dutch border from 26 February 1917 to 10 September 1917; then again to Russia and finally in Ukraine from March 1918.	disbanded post-war
3rd Cavalry	on mobilisation	On the Western Front until December 1914, then occupation duties in Belgium. From 6 April 1915 transferred to Russia and dissolved there on 1 September 1916. Reformed on 9 September 1916 in Hungary and after that in Transylvania.	dissolved November 1916
4th Cavalry	on mobilisation	On the Western Front until November 1914. Transferred to Russia until March 1918. Returned to the Western Front, in Alsace until the end of the war. Dismounted in October 1916 and restructured to form 4th Cavalry Schützen Division.	Schützen Division disbanded post-war
5th Cavalry	on mobilisation	On the Western Front until October 1914, then to the Eastern Front. From 14 July 1915 to 1 September 1915 designated as Cavalry Corps Hendebreck. From October 1916 dismounted.	dissolved 27 February 1918
6th Cavalry	on mobilisation	On the Western Front until October 1914, transferred to Russia until October 1916, and to Romania until February 1917. Returned to the Western Front and in Alsace until July 1918, Flanders until August 1918, Artois to October 1918 and back to Flanders until the end of the war. Dismounted on 5 May 1918 and restructured to form 6th Cavalry Schützen Division.	Schützen Division disbanded post-war
7th Cavalry	on mobilisation	On the Western Front until October 1915, occupation duties in Belgium until October 1916 and to Romania until January 1917. Returned to the Western Front and in Alsace until May 1918, Flanders until August 1918, Artois to October 1918 and back to Flanders until the end of the war. Dismounted on 14 May 1918 and restructured to form 7th Cavalry Schützen Division.	Schützen Division disbanded post-war
8th Cavalry	on mobilisation	On the Western Front until 30 August 1914, then to the Eastern Front. Arrived too late for the Battle of Tannenberg but in time for the Battle of the Masurian Lakes. Dismounted in 1917.	dissolved 9 April 1918
9th Cavalry	on mobilisation	On the Western Front until 27 November 1914, then to Russia. Dismounted in October 1916.	dissolved 3 March 1918
Bavarian Cavalry	on mobilisation	On the Western Front until November 1914. Occupation duties in Belgium until January 1915. Training in Germany until April 1915 before transferring to Russia until November 1917; in Romania until April 1918; then finally in Ukraine/Crimea.	disbanded post-war

== Corps ==
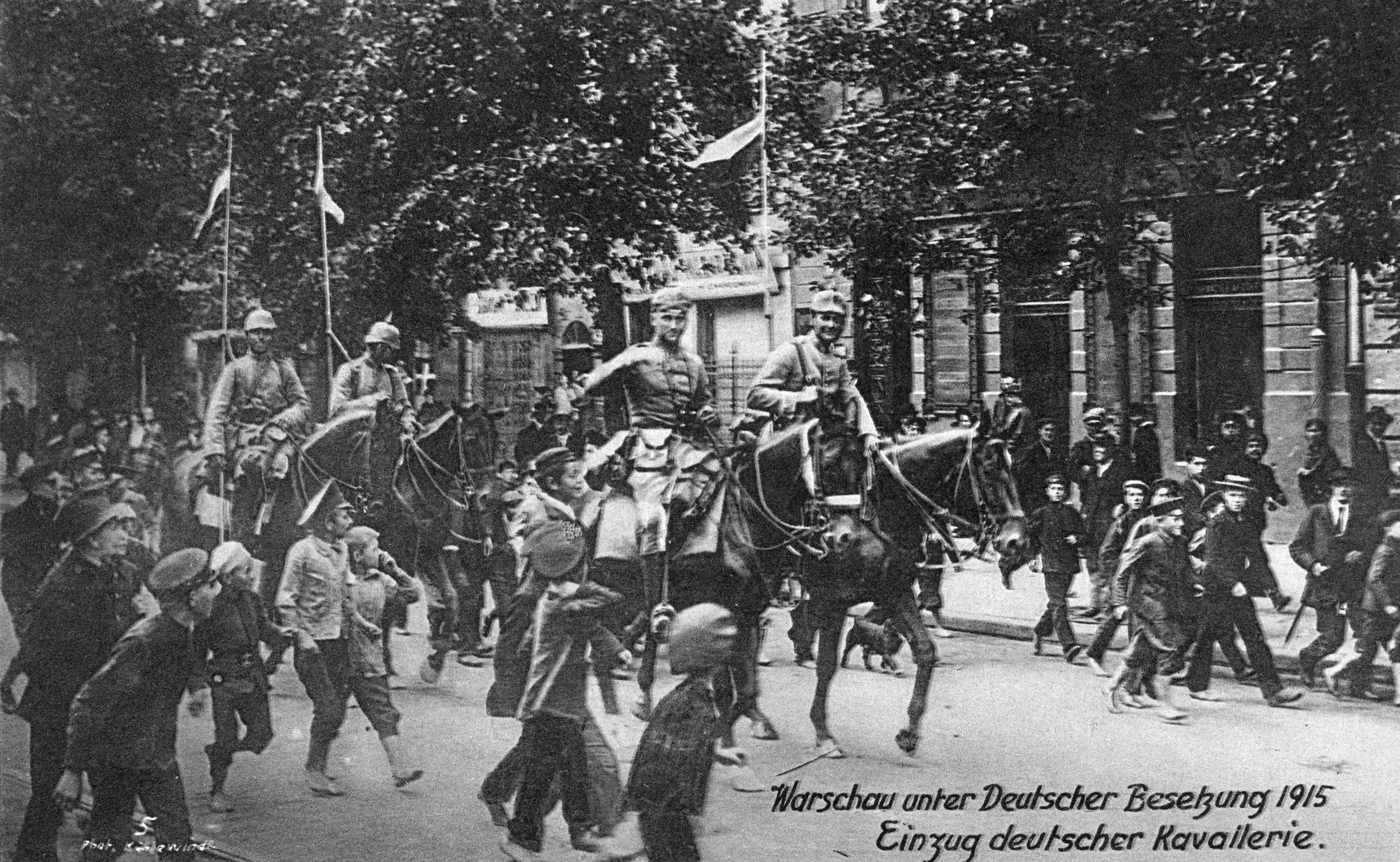
German Cavalry entering Warsaw on 5 August 1915

On mobilisation, the German Army formed 4 Cavalry Corps for the Western Front (just a single Cavalry Division was operating in the East). Initially, each simply consisted of 2 or 3 Cavalry Divisions without any Corps troops; in supply and administration matters, the Cavalry Divisions were entirely autonomous. The Cavalry Corps were entitled Höhere Kavallerie-Kommando (HKK - Higher Cavalry Command) and the commander was only concerned with tactics and strategy, hence his title of Senior Cavalry Commander Höherer Kavallerie-Kommandeur.

By the beginning of 1915, with the solidifying of the trench system, they could no longer find employment on the Western Front. II and IV Cavalry Corps were dissolved and I and III Cavalry Corps were transferred to the East. With less use as pure Cavalry formations, each underwent a series of redesignations according to their particular role from time to time. Two new Corps were formed in June 1915 (V and VI Cavalry Corps) as a gap opened between the Army of the Niemen and 10th Army during the Courland offensive. With the conclusion of the offensive, all four Cavalry Commanders were assigned sectors of the front and thus took on the functions similar to a normal Corps and were reorganised in a similar fashion. Therefore, for the Romanian Campaign, none of the existing Cavalry Corps were brought in, instead a new temporary Cavalry Corps was set up in Transylvania (Cavalry Corps "Schmettow").

Finally, all the Cavalry Corps were redesignated as General Commands for Special Use Generalkommandos zur besonderen Verwendung (Genkdo z.b.V.) and were indistinguishable from other Corps (56th-59th and 65th Corps (z.b.V.)).

War service of Cavalry Corps
Corps	Formed	Combat Chronicle	Fate
I Cavalry Corps	on mobilisation	On Western Front with Guards and 5th Cavalry Divisions preceding 3rd Army. Transferred to the East on 6 November 1914. Variously named for the commander as Cavalry Corps Richthofen, Corps Richthofen and Army Group Richthofen. Redesignated 20 November 1916.	renamed 56th Corps (z.b.V.)
II Cavalry Corps	on mobilisation	On Western Front with 2nd, 4th and 9th Cavalry Divisions preceding 1st and 2nd Armies. Withdrawn to Belgium at the end of November 1914.	dissolved 23 January 1915
III Cavalry Corps	on mobilisation	On Western Front with 7th, 8th and Bavarian Cavalry Divisions preceding 6th Army. Transferred to the East on 9 September 1914. Variously named for the commander as Corps Frommel, Cavalry Corps Frommel and Army Group Frommel. Redesignated 20 November 1916.	renamed 57th Corps (z.b.V.)
IV Cavalry Corps	on mobilisation	On Western Front with 3rd and 6th Cavalry Divisions preceding 4th and 5th Armies. Transferred to the East on 14 November 1914.	dissolved January 1915
V Cavalry Corps	3 June 1915	During the Courland Offensive a wide gap opened between the Army of the Niemen and 10th Army. Set up by the Army of the Niemen as temporary Cavalry Corps Schmettow, commanded by Generalleutnant Egon Graf von Schmettow. Established 18 August 1915. Redesignated 20 November 1916.	renamed 58th Corps (z.b.V.)
VI Cavalry Corps	June 1915	During the Courland Offensive a wide gap opened between the Army of the Niemen and 10th Army. Set up by the 10th Army as a temporary Cavalry Corps. Established 18 August 1915. Redesignated 20 November 1916.	renamed 59th Corps (z.b.V.)
Cavalry Corps "Schmettow"		Temporary formation set up for the invasion of Romania under the command of Generalleutnant Eberhard Graf von Schmettow. Redesignated 11 January 1917.	renamed 65th Corps (z.b.V.)

== End of the War ==
By the end of the war

- all the Cavalry Corps had been redesignated as General Commands for Special Use (Genkdo z.b.V.) and were indistinguishable from other Corps
- of 11 Cavalry Divisions, just 3 remained in the East (and 4 Schützen Divisions in the West)
- just 10 Cavalry Brigades remained as mounted formations
- 22 Cavalry Regiments remained mounted, just a fifth of the active regiments mobilised in 1914
- a further 27 active regiments and 5 war-formed regiments continued to serve as Cavalry Schützen Regiments
- about 250 individual squadrons remained mounted as divisional cavalry; they represented 61 active and 22 war-formed regiments

As the war ended, the regiments marched back to Germany and dissolved as the troops reached their home towns. A number of regiments were perpetuated as squadrons of the post-war Reichswehr.

== See also ==
- Bavarian Army
- German Army (German Empire)
- German Army order of battle (1914)
- Horses in World War I
- List of Imperial German cavalry regiments
- TOE, German Cavalry Division, August 1914

== Bibliography ==
- Cron, Hermann (2002). Imperial German Army 1914-18: Organisation, Structure, Orders-of-Battle [first published: 1937]. Helion & Co. ISBN 1-874622-70-1.
- Ellis, John; Cox, Michael (1993). The World War I Databook. Aurum Press Ltd. ISBN 1-85410-766-6.
- Haythornthwaite, Philip J. (1996). The World War One Source Book. Arms and Armour. ISBN 1-85409-351-7.
- Sweetman, John (2002). Tannenberg 1914. Cassell & Co. ISBN 0-304-35635-2.
- Histories of Two Hundred and Fifty-One Divisions of the German Army which Participated in the War (1914-1918), compiled from records of Intelligence section of the General Staff, American Expeditionary Forces, at General Headquarters, Chaumont, France 1919. The London Stamp Exchange Ltd. 1989 [1920]. ISBN 0-948130-87-3.
- The German Forces in the Field; 7th Revision, 11th November 1918; Compiled by the General Staff, War Office. Imperial War Museum, London and the Battery Press. 1995 [1918]. ISBN 978-1-870423-95-3.
