= Cavalry Corps Schmettow =

Cavalry Corps Schmettow 65th Corps (z.b.V.)
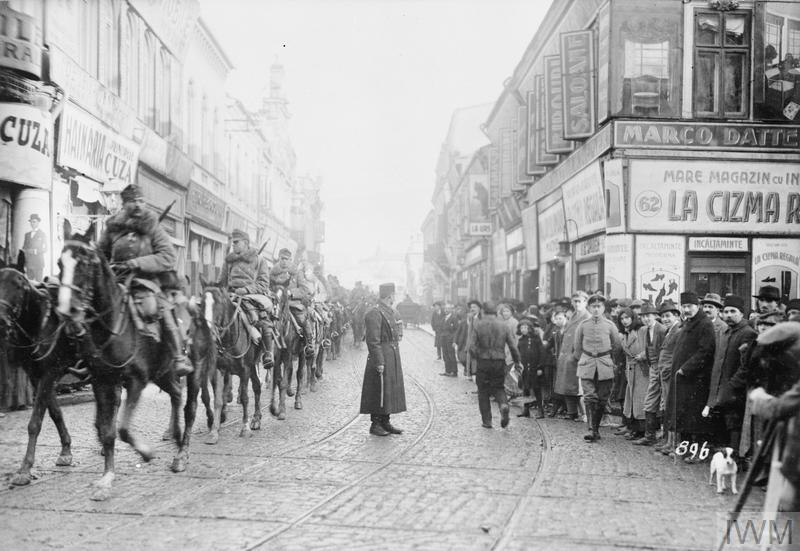
- Austro-Hungarian cavalry entering Bucharest on 6 December 1916
- Active: August 1916-1919
- Disbanded: 1919
- Country: German Empire
- Allegiance: Imperial German Army
- Branch: Cavalry
- Type: Corps
- Size: 2-4 divisions
- Engagements: World War I: Romanian campaign; Battle of Transylvania; Battle of Bucharest; Battle of the Argeș; Western Front; Second Battle of the Aisne; Third Battle of the Aisne; Second Battle of the Marne

Commanders
- Notable commanders: Eberhard Graf von Schmettow

Cavalry Corps Schmettow was a formation of the German Army in World War I.

== Cavalry Corps Schmettow ==
By August 1916, the four existing Cavalry Commanders (I, III, V and VI Cavalry Corps) had been assigned sectors of the Eastern Front and thus took on the functions similar to a normal Corps and had been reorganised in a similar fashion. Therefore, for the Romanian Campaign, none of the existing Cavalry Corps were brought in. Instead, a new temporary Cavalry Corps was set up in Transylvania - Cavalry Corps "Schmettow" - under the command of Generalleutnant Eberhard Graf von Schmettow. It was formed with:

- 51st Honvéd Infantry Division (Austria-Hungary)
- 3rd Cavalry Division
- 1st Cavalry Division (Austria-Hungary)

Redesignated 11 January 1917 as 65th Corps (z.b.V.).

== 65th Corps ==
65th Corps (z.b.V.) was formed on 11 January 1917 by the redesignation of Cavalry Corps "Schmettow". As the need for large mounted cavalry formations diminished as the war went on, the existing Cavalry Corps increasingly took on the characteristics of a normal Corps Command. This culminated in them being redesignated as "General Commands for Special Use" Generalkommandos zur besonderen Verwendung (Genkdo z.b.V.).

By the end of the war, the Corps was serving on the Western Front as part of the 7th Army with the following composition:

- 5th Division
- 4th Guards Division
- 216th Division
- 50th Division

== Commanders ==
Cavalry Corps Schmettow / 65th Corps was commanded throughout its existence by Generalleutnant Eberhard Graf von Schmettow.

== See also ==
- German Army (German Empire)
- German Army order of battle, Western Front (1918)
- German cavalry in World War I

== Bibliography ==
- Cron, Hermann (2002). Imperial German Army 1914-18: Organisation, Structure, Orders-of-Battle [first published: 1937]. Helion & Co. ISBN 1-874622-70-1.
- Ellis, John; Cox, Michael (1993). The World War I Databook. Aurum Press Ltd. ISBN 1-85410-766-6.
