= I Cavalry Corps (German Empire) =

Imperial German Army military unit

I Cavalry Corps German: Höhere Kavallerie-Kommando 1 Higher Cavalry Command 1
- Flag of the Staff of a Generalkommando (1871–1918)
- Active: 2 August 1914 – 3 March 1918
- Disbanded: 1919
- Country: German Empire
- Branch: Army
- Type: Cavalry
- Size: Approximately 13,000 (on mobilisation)
- Engagements: World War I

Insignia
- Abbreviation: HKK 1

The I Cavalry Corps (German: Höhere Kavallerie-Kommando 1 / HKK 1, lit. 'Higher Cavalry Command 1') was a formation of the Imperial German Army in World War I. It was formed on the mobilization of the German army in August 1914 and disbanded in March 1918.

== I Cavalry Corps ==
The Corps initially served on the Western Front with the Guards and 5th Cavalry Divisions and preceded the 3rd Army. By 15 September 1914, it had been assigned to 2nd Army and comprised the Guards and 2nd Cavalry Divisions. It was transferred to the east on 6 November 1914 and attached to the 9th Army. By 8 February 1915, it consisted of the 6th and 9th Cavalry Divisions.

At various times, the Corps was variously named after its commander as Cavalry Corps Richthofen, Corps Richthofen, and Army Group Richthofen.

It remained with the 9th Army until 20 November 1916, when it was redesignated as 56th Corps (z.b.V.).

== 56th Corps ==
56th Corps (z.b.V.) was formed on 20 November 1916 by the redesignation of I Cavalry Corps. As the need for large mounted cavalry formations diminished as the war went on, the existing Cavalry Corps increasingly took on the characteristics of a normal Corps Command. This culminated in them being redesignated as "General Commands for Special Use" Generalkommandos zur besonderen Verwendung (Genkdo z.b.V.). 56th Corps was disbanded on 5 March 1918.

== Order of battle on mobilisation ==
Initially, the Corps simply consisted of two Cavalry Divisions (with three Jäger battalions attached) without any Corps troops; in supply and administration matters, the Cavalry Divisions were entirely autonomous. The commander was only concerned with tactics and strategy, hence his title of Senior Cavalry Commander (Höherer Kavallerie-Kommandeur).

On formation in August 1914, the Corps consisted of:

- Guards Cavalry Division
- 5th Cavalry Division
- Kurhessisches Jäger-Batl.Nr.11
- Kgl. Sächs. 1. Jäger-Batl.Nr.12
- Kgl. Sächs. 2. Jäger-Batl.Nr.13

Each cavalry division consisted of 3 cavalry brigades (6 regiments each of 4 squadrons), a horse artillery Abteilung (three 4-gun batteries), a machine gun detachment (company size, 6 machine guns), plus pioneers, signals and a motor vehicle column. The Jäger battalions each consisted of four light infantry companies, one machine gun company (6 machine guns), one cyclist company and a motorised vehicle column.

== Commanders ==
I Cavalry Corps / 56th Corps had the following commanders during its existence:

Commander	From	To
General der Kavallerie Manfred Freiherr von Richthofen	2 August 1914	23 September 1916
General der Kavallerie Götz Freiherr von König	23 September 1916	5 March 1918

== See also ==
- German Army (German Empire)
- German Army order of battle (1914)
- German cavalry in World War I
- TOE, German Cavalry Division, August 1914

== Bibliography ==
- Cron, Hermann (2002). Imperial German Army 1914-18: Organisation, Structure, Orders-of-Battle [first published: 1937]. Helion & Co. ISBN 1-874622-70-1.
- Ellis, John; Cox, Michael (1993). The World War I Databook. Aurum Press Ltd. ISBN 1-85410-766-6.
