= 8th Cavalry Division (German Empire) =

8th Cavalry Division (8. Kavallerie-Division)
- Flag of the Staff of a Division (1871–1918)
- Active: 2 August 1914 – 9 April 1918
- Disbanded: 9 April 1918
- Country: German Empire
- Branch: Army
- Type: Cavalry
- Size: Approximately 5,000 (on mobilisation)
- Engagements: World War I First Battle of the Masurian Lakes

The 8th Cavalry Division (8. Kavallerie-Division) was a unit of the German Army in World War I. The division was formed on the mobilization of the German Army in August 1914. The division was dissolved in April 1918. The majority of the division was drawn from the Kingdom of Saxony.

== Combat chronicle ==
It was initially assigned to III Cavalry Corps, which preceded the 6th Army on the Western Front. On 30 August 1914, it was transferred to the Eastern Front, where it arrived too late for the Battle of Tannenberg but in time for the Battle of the Masurian Lakes. It was dismounted in 1917 and dissolved on 9 April 1918.

A more detailed combat chronicle can be found at the German-language version of this article.

== Order of Battle on mobilisation ==
On formation, in August 1914, the component units of the division were:

- 23rd Cavalry Brigade (from XII (1st Royal Saxon) Corps District)
  - 1st Royal Saxon Guards Heavy Cavalry
  - 17th (1st Royal Saxon) Uhlans "Emperor Francis Joseph of Austria, King of Hungary"
- 38th Cavalry Brigade (from XI Corps District)
  - 2nd Jäger zu Pferde
  - 6th Jäger zu Pferde
- 40th Cavalry Brigade (from XIX (2nd Royal Saxon) Corps District)
  - Carabiniers (2nd Royal Saxon Heavy Cavalry)
  - 21st (3rd Royal Saxon) Uhlans
- Horse Artillery Abteilung of the 12th (1st Royal Saxon) Field Artillery Regiment
- 8th Cavalry Machine Gun Detachment
- Cavalry Pioneer Detachment
- Cavalry Signals Detachment
  - Heavy Wireless Station 25
  - Light Wireless Station 16
  - Light Wireless Station 20
- Cavalry Motorised Vehicle Column 8

See: Table of Organisation and Equipment

== Changes in organization ==
- 23rd Cavalry Brigade joined 1st Cavalry Division on 1 February 1917.
- 38th Cavalry Brigade joined Guard Cavalry Division on 20 April 1918.
- 40th Cavalry Brigade dissolved on 10 April 1918.
- 39th Cavalry Brigade joined from 4th Cavalry Division on 1 February 1917. Rejoined 4th Cavalry Division on 6 April 1918.

== See also ==
- German Army (German Empire)
- German cavalry in World War I
- German Army order of battle (1914)

== Bibliography ==
- Cron, Hermann (2002). Imperial German Army 1914–18: Organisation, Structure, Orders-of-Battle [first published: 1937]. Helion & Co. ISBN 1-874622-70-1.
- Ellis, John; Cox, Michael (1993). The World War I Databook. Aurum Press Ltd. ISBN 1-85410-766-6.
- Sweetman, John (2002). Tannenberg 1914. Cassell & Co. ISBN 0-304-35635-2.
