= 6th Cavalry Division (German Empire) =

6th Cavalry Division (6. Kavallerie-Division)
- Flag of the Staff of a Division (1871–1918)
- Active: 2 August 1914 – 1919
- Disbanded: 1919
- Country: German Empire
- Branch: Army
- Type: Cavalry
- Size: Approximately 5,000 (on mobilization)
- Engagements: World War I

The 6th Cavalry Division (6. Kavallerie-Division) was a unit of the German Army that fought on Eastern and Western Fronts during World War I. The division was formed on the mobilization of the German Army in August 1914 and was disbanded in 1919 during the demobilization of the German Army after World War I.

== Combat chronicle ==
After formation, the division was initially assigned to IV Cavalry Corps, which preceded the 4th and 5th Armies on the Western Front. In October 1914, it was transferred to Russia and then in October 1916 to Romania. In February 1917, it returned to the Western Front, where it served in Alsace until July 1918, Flanders until August 1918, and Artois to October 1918 before moving back to Flanders where it remained until the end of the war. Dismounted on 5 May 1918, it was restructured to form 6th Cavalry Schützen Division. By the end of the war, it was serving under the Guards Corps, 4th Army, Heeresgruppe Kronprinz Rupprecht on the Western Front.

A more detailed combat chronicle can be found at the German-language version of this article.

== Order of Battle on mobilization ==
On formation, in August 1914, the component units of the division were:

- 28th Cavalry Brigade (from XIV Army Corps District)
  - 20th (1st Baden) Life-Dragoons
  - 21st (2nd Baden) Dragoons
- 33rd Cavalry Brigade (from XVI Corps District)
  - 9th (1st Hannover) Dragoons "King Charles I of Rumania"
  - 13th (Schleswig-Holstein) Dragoons
- 45th Cavalry Brigade (from XVI Army Corps District)
  - 13th (1st Kurhessian) Hussars "King Umberto of Italy"
  - 13th Jäger zu Pferde
- Horse Artillery Abteilung of the 8th (1st Rhenish) Field Artillery "von Holtzendorff" Regiment
- 6th Machine Gun Detachment
- Pioneer Detachment
- Signals Detachment
  - Heavy Wireless Station 4
  - Light Wireless Station 9
  - Light Wireless Station 11
- Cavalry Motorised Vehicle Column 6

See: Table of Organisation and Equipment

== 6th Cavalry Schützen Division ==
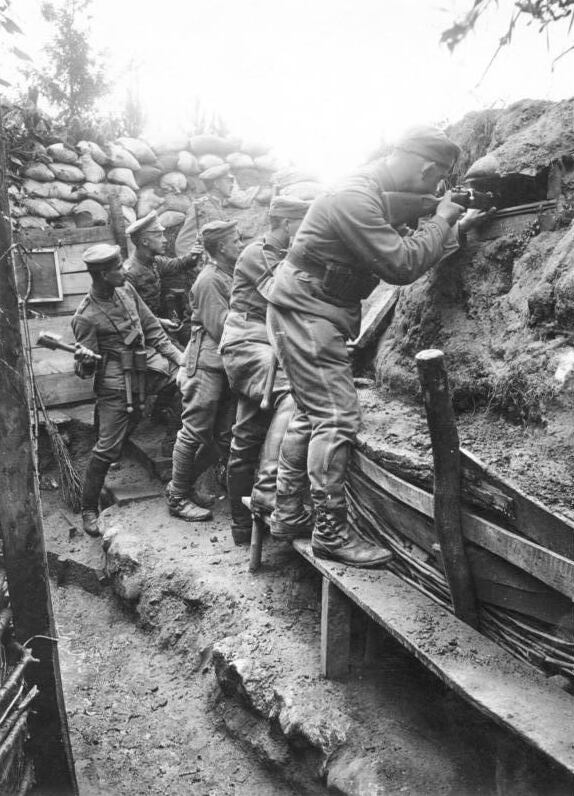
German cavalry of the 11th Reserve Hussar Regiment in a trench in France in 1916

The 6th Cavalry Division was extensively reorganized during the course of the war, culminating in its conversion to a Cavalry Schützen Division, which was a dismounted cavalry formation. The cavalry brigades were then renamed Cavalry Schützen Commands and performed a similar role to that of an infantry regiment command. Likewise, the cavalry regiments became Cavalry Schützen Regiments and were allocated the role of infantry battalions, with their squadrons acting as infantry companies. However, these units were much weaker than normal infantry formations as a Schützen squadron had a strength of just four officers and 109 NCOs and other ranks, which was considerably less than that of an infantry company.

- 28th Cavalry Brigade transferred to the 4th Cavalry Division on 1 February 1917;
- 33rd Cavalry Brigade became independent on 14 September 1916;
- 45th Cavalry Brigade became independent on 14 October 1916. It rejoined the division from the 4th Cavalry Division on 1 May 1918 and was renamed 45th Cavalry Schützen Command on 6 May 1918;
- 3rd Cavalry Brigade joined the division from the 4th Cavalry Division on 17 October 1916 and was renamed 3rd Cavalry Schützen Command on 6 May 1918;
- 5th Cavalry Brigade (formerly independent) joined the division on 19 October 1916 and renamed 5th Cavalry Schützen Command on 11 May 1918;
- 8th Cavalry Brigade joined from 1st Cavalry Division on 18 October 1916 and became independent on 6 October 1917.

== Late World War I organization ==
Allied Intelligence rated this division as 4th Class (of four classes). Its late war organization was:

- 170th Landwehr Brigade
  - 3rd Cavalry Schützen Command
    - 2nd (Pomeranian) Cuirassiers “Queen”
    - 12th (Thuringian) Hussars
    - 3rd (1st Brandenburg) Uhlans "Emperor Alexander II of Russia"
  - 5th Cavalry Schützen Command
    - 7th (Magdeburg) Cuirassiers "von Seydlitz"
    - 2nd (1st Brandenburg) Dragoons
    - 9th (2nd Pomeranian) Uhlans
  - 45th Cavalry Schützen Command
    - 13th (1st Kurhessian) Hussars "King Umberto of Italy"
    - 13th Jäger zu Pferde
    - 7th Reserve Dragoons
- 5th Squadron, 13th (1st Hannover) King's Uhlans (mounted cavalry)
- 133rd Artillery Command
  - 4th Abteilung, 3rd (General-Feldzeugmeister) (1st Brandenburg) Field Artillery Regiment
  - 3rd and 4th Abteilungen, 11th (1st Kurhessian) Field Artillery Regiment
  - 915th Light Ammunition Column
- Pioneer Battalion
  - 5th Reserve Company, II Pioneer Battalion No. 12
  - 1st Reserve Company, II Pioneer Battalion No. 21
- 94th Signal Command
  - 94th Telephone Detachment
  - 184th Wireless Detachment
- Medical and Veterinary
  - 256th Ambulance Company
  - 106th Field Hospital
  - 86th Reserve Field Hospital
  - 261st Vet. Hospital
- Train
  - 674th Motor Transport Column
- Heavy Artillery
  - 108th Foot Artillery Battalion

== See also ==
- German Army (German Empire)
- German cavalry in World War I
- German Army order of battle (1914)

== Bibliography ==
- Cron, Hermann (2002) [1937]. Imperial German Army 1914–18: Organisation, Structure, Orders-of-Battle. Helion & Co. ISBN 1-874622-70-1.
- Ellis, John; Cox, Michael (1993). The World War I Databook. Aurum Press Ltd. ISBN 1-85410-766-6.
- Histories of Two Hundred and Fifty-One Divisions of the German Army which Participated in the War (1914–1918), compiled from records of Intelligence section of the General Staff, American Expeditionary Forces, at General Headquarters, Chaumont, France 1919. The London Stamp Exchange Ltd. 1989 [1920]. ISBN 0-948130-87-3.
- The German Forces in the Field; 7th Revision, 11th November 1918; Compiled by the General Staff, War Office. Imperial War Museum, London and the Battery Press. 1995 [1918]. ISBN 978-1-870423-95-3.
