= 2nd Cavalry Division (German Empire) =

Unit of the German Army in World War I

2nd Cavalry Division (2. Kavallerie-Division)
- Flag of the Staff of a Division (1871–1918)
- Active: 2 August 1914-1919
- Disbanded: 1919
- Country: German Empire
- Branch: Army
- Type: Cavalry
- Size: Approximately 5,000 (on mobilisation)
- Engagements: World War I

The 2nd Cavalry Division (2. Kavallerie-Division) was a unit of the German Army in World War I. The division was formed on the mobilization of the German Army in August 1914. The division was disbanded in 1919 during the demobilization of the German Army after World War I.

== Combat chronicle ==
It was initially assigned to II Cavalry Corps, which preceded the 1st and 2nd Armies on the Western Front. On 12 November 1914, it was transferred to Russia and then to Romania on 25 November 1916, returning to the West in December 1916. It served as a Frontier Guard on the Dutch border from 26 February 1917 to 10 September 1917; then it was again transferred to Russia and finally to Ukraine in March 1918.

A more detailed combat chronicle can be found at the German-language version of this article.

== Order of Battle on mobilisation ==
On formation, in August 1914, the component units of the division were:

- 5th Cavalry Brigade (from III Corps District)
  - 2nd (1st Brandenburg) Dragoons
  - 3rd (1st Brandenburg) Uhlans "Emperor Alexander II of Russia"
- 8th Cavalry Brigade (from IV Corps District)
  - 7th (Magdeburg) Cuirassiers "von Seydlitz"
  - 12th (Thuringian) Hussars
- Leib Hussar Brigade (from XVII Corps District)
  - 1st Life Hussars "Totenkopf"
  - 2nd Life Hussars "Queen Victoria of Prussia"
- Horse Artillery Abteilung of the 35th (1st West Prussian) Field Artillery Regiment
- 4th Machine Gun Detachment
- Pioneer Detachment
- Signals Detachment
  - Heavy Wireless Station 1
  - Light Wireless Station 5
  - Light Wireless Station 6
- Cavalry Motorised Vehicle Column 2

See: Table of Organisation and Equipment

== Late World War I organization ==
About August 1916, the division was significantly restructured.

- Leib Hussar Brigade became independent on 20 August 1916
- 5th Cavalry Brigade became independent on 8 August 1916
- 8th Cavalry brigade was transferred to 1st Cavalry Division on 25 July 1916
- 22nd Cavalry Brigade joined on 13 August 1916 from 3rd Cavalry Division
- 25th Cavalry Brigade joined on 23 September 1916 also from 3rd Cavalry Division
- 7th Bavarian Cavalry Brigade "Siebenburgische" joined (previously independent) and left again on 18 February 1918

Allied Intelligence rated the division as 4th Class. The organisation in 1918 was:

- 22nd Cavalry Brigade
  - 5th (Rhenish) Dragoons "Baron Manteuffel"
  - 14th (2nd Kurhessian) Hussars "Landgrave Frederick II of Hesse-Homburg"
- 25th Cavalry Brigade
  - 23rd Guards Dragoons (1st Grand Ducal Hessian)
  - 24th Life Dragoons (2nd Grand Ducal Hessian)
- 7th Bavarian Cavalry Brigade "Siebenburgische"
  - 4th Royal Bavarian Chevau-légers "King"
  - 5th Royal Bavarian Chevau-légers "Archduke Albrecht of Austria"
- Horse Artillery Abteilung of the 15th (1st Upper Alsatian) Field Artillery Regiment
- 2nd Pioneer Detachment
- 7th Pioneer Detachment
- 200th Bavarian TM Company
- 21st Ambulance Company
- 2nd MG Detachment
- 3rd MG Detachment
- Attached
  - 4th Jager Battalion
  - 1st Cyclist Company, 3rd Jager Battalion
  - 2nd Cyclist Company, 3rd Jager Battalion

== See also ==
- German Army (German Empire)
- German cavalry in World War I
- German Army order of battle (1914)

== Bibliography ==
- Cron, Hermann (2002). Imperial German Army 1914-18: Organisation, Structure, Orders-of-Battle [first published: 1937]. Helion & Co. ISBN 1-874622-70-1.
- Ellis, John; Cox, Michael (1993). The World War I Databook. Aurum Press Ltd. ISBN 1-85410-766-6.
- Histories of Two Hundred and Fifty-One Divisions of the German Army which Participated in the War (1914-1918), compiled from records of Intelligence section of the General Staff, American Expeditionary Forces, at General Headquarters, Chaumont, France 1919. The London Stamp Exchange Ltd. 1989 [1920]. ISBN 0-948130-87-3.
