= 4th Cavalry Division (German Empire) =

4th Cavalry Division (4. Kavallerie-Division)
- Flag of the Staff of a Division (1871–1918)
- Active: 2 August 1914-1919
- Disbanded: 1919
- Country: German Empire
- Branch: Army
- Type: Cavalry
- Size: Approximately 5,000 (on mobilisation)
- Engagements: World War I

The 4th Cavalry Division (4. Kavallerie-Division) was a unit of the German Army in World War I. The division was formed on the mobilization of the German Army in August 1914. The division was disbanded in 1919 during the demobilization of the German Army after World War I.

== Combat chronicle ==
It was initially assigned to II Cavalry Corps, which preceded the 1st and 2nd Armies on the Western Front. In November 1914, it was transferred to Russia. In March 1918, it returned to the Western Front, where it served in Alsace until the end of the war. It was dismounted in October 1916 and restructured to form the 4th Cavalry Schützen Division. By the end of the war, it was serving under 64th Corps (z.b.V.), Armee-Abteilung B, Heeresgruppe Herzog Albrecht von Württemberg on the Western Front.

A more detailed combat chronicle can be found at the German-language version of this article.

== Order of Battle on mobilisation ==
On formation, in August 1914, the component units of the division were:

- 3rd Cavalry Brigade (from II Army Corps District)
  - 2nd (Pomeranian) Cuirassiers “Queen”
  - 9th (2nd Pomeranian) Uhlans
- 17th Cavalry Brigade (from IX Corps District)
  - 17th (1st Grand Ducal Mecklenburgian) Dragoons
  - 18th (2nd Grand Ducal Mecklenburgian) Dragoons
- 18th Cavalry Brigade (from IX Army Corps District)
  - 15th (Hannover) Hussars "Queen Wilhelmina of the Netherlands"
  - 16th (Schleswig-Holstein) Hussars "Emperor Francis Joseph of Austria, King of Hungary"
- Horse Artillery Abteilung of the 3rd (1st Brandenburg) Field Artillery "General-Feldzeugmeister" Regiment
- 2nd Guards Machine Gun Detachment
- Pioneer Detachment
- Signals Detachment
  - Heavy Wireless Station 18
  - Heavy Wireless Station 19
  - Light Wireless Station 10
  - Light Wireless Station 12
- Cavalry Motorised Vehicle Column 4

See: Table of Organisation and Equipment

== 4th Cavalry Schützen Division ==
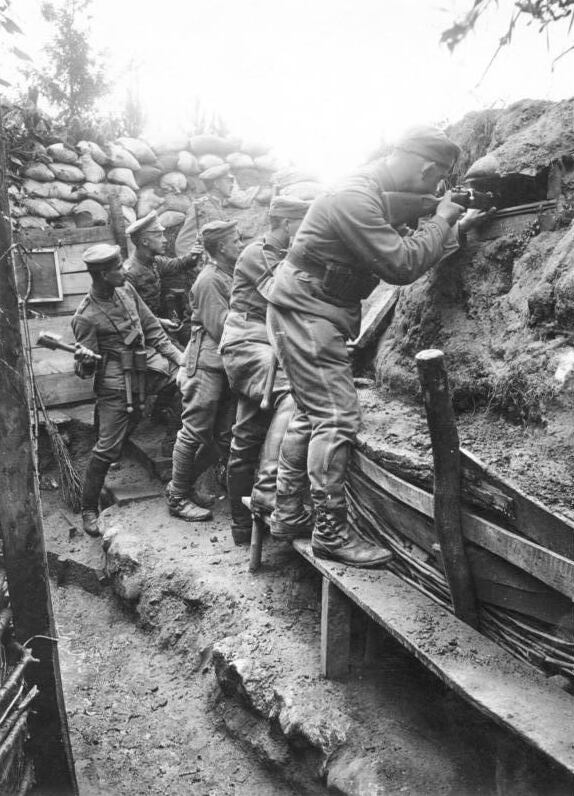
German cavalry of the 11th Reserve Hussar Regiment in a trench in France in 1916

The 4th Cavalry Division was extensively reorganised in the course of the war, culminating in its conversion to a Cavalry Schützen Division, that is to say, dismounted cavalry. Here, the cavalry brigades were renamed Cavalry Schützen Commands and performed a similar role to that of an infantry regiment command. Likewise, the cavalry regiments became Cavalry Schützen Regiments and allocated the role of an infantry battalion (and their squadrons acted as infantry companies). However, these units were much weaker than normal infantry formations (for example, a Schützen squadron had a strength of just 4 officers and 109 NCOs and other ranks, considerably less than that of an infantry company).

- 3rd Cavalry Brigade became independent on 30 November 1914
- 17th Cavalry Brigade became independent on 1 February 1917
- 18th Cavalry Brigade transferred to 1st Cavalry Division on 12 December 1916
- 28th Cavalry Brigade joined from 6th Cavalry Division on 1 February 1917. Transferred to 7th Cavalry Division on 17 May 1918
- 39th Cavalry Brigade reconstituted on 28 September 1914 (original brigade had been broken up on mobilisation). Transferred to 8th Cavalry Division on 1 February 1917. Rejoined from 8th Cavalry Division on 6 April 1918
- 45th Cavalry Brigade (previously independent) joined on 1 February 1917. Transferred to 6th Cavalry Division on 1 May 1918

== Late World War I organization ==
Allied Intelligence rated this division as 4th Class (of 4 classes). It's late war organisation made it more akin to a Landwehr Division and was:

- 39th Cavalry Brigade
    - Saxon Reserve Uhlans (Schützen)
    - 9th Reserve Uhlans (Schützen)
    - 87th Cavalry (Schützen)
  - 38th Landwehr Infantry Regiment
  - 40th Landwehr Infantry Regiment
- 2nd Guards Machine Gun Detachment
- 6th Machine Gun Detachment
- Artillery Command
  - Horse Artillery Abteilung of the 8th (von Holtzendorff) (1st Rhenish) Field Artillery Regiment
  - Horse Artillery Abteilung of the 10th (von Scharnhorst) (1st Hannover) Field Artillery Regiment
  - 1400th Light Ammunition Column
  - 1405th Light Ammunition Column
- Pioneer Battalion
  - 4th Cavalry Pioneer Detachment
  - 145th Light Searchlight Section
- Signal Command
  - 934th Telephone Detachment
- Medical and Veterinary
  - 21st? Ambulance Company
  - 573rd Ambulance Company
  - 191st Field Hospital
  - Vet. Hospital
- Attached
  - Landsturm Infantry Battalion 1 Torgau (IV/15)

== See also ==
- German Army (German Empire)
- German cavalry in World War I
- German Army order of battle (1914)

== Bibliography ==
- Cron, Hermann (2002). Imperial German Army 1914-18: Organisation, Structure, Orders-of-Battle [first published: 1937]. Helion & Co. ISBN 1-874622-70-1.
- Ellis, John; Cox, Michael (1993). The World War I Databook. Aurum Press Ltd. ISBN 1-85410-766-6.
- Histories of Two Hundred and Fifty-One Divisions of the German Army which Participated in the War (1914-1918), compiled from records of Intelligence section of the General Staff, American Expeditionary Forces, at General Headquarters, Chaumont, France 1919. The London Stamp Exchange Ltd. 1989 [1920]. ISBN 0-948130-87-3.
- The German Forces in the Field; 7th Revision, 11th November 1918; Compiled by the General Staff, War Office. Imperial War Museum, London and the Battery Press. 1995 [1918]. ISBN 978-1-870423-95-3.
