= 2nd Division (German Empire) =

2nd Division (2. Division); in 1870-71 and from August 2, 1914, 2nd Infantry Division (2. Infanterie-Division)
- Active: 1818–1919
- Country: Prussia/Germany
- Branch: Army
- Type: Infantry (in peacetime included cavalry)
- Size: Approx. 10,000
- Part of: I. Army Corps (I. Armeekorps)
- Garrison/HQ: Danzig (1819–90), Königsberg (1890–99), Insterburg (1899–1919)
- Engagements: Austro-Prussian War: Trutnov, Königgrätz Franco-Prussian War: Noiseville, Gravelotte, Metz, Amiens, Hallue, St. Quentin World War I: Gumbinnen, Tannenberg, 1st Masurian Lakes, 2nd Masurian Lakes

Commanders
- Notable commanders: Otto von Below

The 2nd Division (2. Division) was a unit of the Prussian/German Army. It was formed in Danzig (now Gdańsk, Poland) in March 1816 as a Troop Brigade (Truppen-Brigade). It became the 2nd Division on September 5, 1818. In 1890, the headquarters of the division was relocated to Königsberg (now Kaliningrad, Russia), then the capital of East Prussia. In 1899, the headquarters was moved to Insterburg (now Chernyakhovsk, Russia), further inland and closer to the border with the Russian Empire. From the latter's formation in 1820, the division was subordinated in peacetime to the I Army Corps (I. Armeekorps). The 2nd Division was disbanded in 1919 during the demobilization of the German Army after World War I.

The 2nd Division and its regiments fought in the Austro-Prussian War against Austria in 1866, including the Battle of Königgrätz. The division then fought in the Franco-Prussian War against France in 1870-71. Its regiments saw action in the Battle of Noiseville, the Battle of Gravelotte, the Siege of Metz, the Battle of Amiens, the Battle of Hallue, and the Battle of St. Quentin, among other actions.

In World War I, the division served primarily on the Eastern Front, seeing action at the battles of Gumbinnen and Tannenberg, and the 1st and 2nd Battles of the Masurian Lakes. After Russia's defeat in the war, the division saw service on the Western Front in 1918, and ended the war occupying positions around Antwerp and along the Maas in Belgium.

== 1870 organization ==
During wartime, the 2nd Division, like other German divisions, detached most of its cavalry and was redesignated an infantry division. The organization of the 2nd Infantry Division in 1870 at the beginning of the Franco-Prussian War was as follows:

- 3rd Infantry Brigade (3. Infanterie-Brigade)
  - 3rd East Prussian Grenadier Regiment No. 4 (3. Ostpreußisches Grenadier-Regiment Nr. 4)
  - 7th East Prussian Infantry Regiment No. 44 (7. Ostpreußisches Infanterie-Regiment Nr. 44)
- 4th Infantry Brigade (4. Infanterie-Brigade)
  - 4th East Prussian Grenadier Regiment No. 5 (4. Ostpreußisches Grenadier-Regiment Nr. 5)
  - 8th East Prussian Infantry Regiment No. 45 (8. Ostpreußisches Infanterie-Regiment Nr. 45)
- 10th Dragoon Regiment (Dragoner-Regiment Nr. 10)

== Pre-World War I organization ==
Many regiments were renamed and assigned to different divisions during the period from 1871 to 1914. In 1914, the peacetime organization of the 2nd Division was as follows:

- 3rd Infantry Brigade (3. Infanterie-Brigade)
  - 4th Grenadier Regiment "King Frederick the Great" (3rd East Prussian) (Grenadier-Regiment König Friedrich der Große (3. Ostpreuß.) Nr. 4)
  - 44th Infantry Regiment "Graf Dönhoff" (7th East Prussian) (Infanterie-Regiment Graf Dönhoff (7. Ostpreuß.) Nr. 44)
- 4th Infantry Brigade (4. Infanterie-Brigade)
  - 33rd Fusilier Regiment "Graf Roon" (East Prussian) (Füsilier-Regiment Graf Roon (Ostpreuß.) Nr. 33)
  - 45th Infantry Regiment (8th East Prussian) (8. Ostpreuß. Infanterie-Regiment Nr. 45)
- 2nd Cavalry Brigade (2. Kavallerie-Brigade)
  - 12th (Lithuanian) Uhlans (Litthauisches Ulanen-Regiment Nr. 12)
  - 9th Mounted Rifles (Jäger-Regiment zu Pferde Nr. 9)
- 43rd Cavalry Brigade (43. Kavallerie-Brigade)
  - 8th (East Prussian) Uhlans "Count zu Dohna" (Ulanen-Regiment Graf zu Dohna (Ostpreuß.) Nr. 8)
  - 10th Mounted Rifles (Jäger-Regiment zu Pferde Nr. 10)
- 2nd Field Artillery Brigade (2. Feldartillerie-Brigade)
  - 1st Field Artillery Regiment "Prince August of Prussia" (1st Lithuanian) (Feldartillerie-Regiment Prinz August von Preußen (1. Litthau.) Nr. 1)
  - 37th Field Artillery Regiment (2nd Lithuanian) (2. Litthau. Feldartillerie-Regiment Nr. 37)

== August 1914 organization ==
On mobilization in August 1914 at the beginning of World War I, most divisional cavalry, including brigade headquarters, was withdrawn to form cavalry divisions or split up among divisions as reconnaissance units. Divisions received engineer companies and other support units from their higher headquarters. The 2nd Division was again renamed the 2nd Infantry Division. Its initial wartime organization (major units) was as follows:

- 3rd Infantry Brigade (3. Infanterie-Brigade)
  - 4th Grenadier Regiment "King Frederick the Great" (3rd East Prussian) (Grenadier-Regiment König Friedrich der Große (3. Ostpreuß.) Nr. 4)
  - 44th Infantry Regiment "Graf Dönhoff" (7th East Prussian) (Infanterie-Regiment Graf Dönhoff (7. Ostpreuß.) Nr. 44)
- 4th Infantry Brigade (4. Infanterie-Brigade)
  - 33rd Fusilier Regiment "Graf Roon" (East Prussian) (Füsilier-Regiment Graf Roon (Ostpreuß.) Nr. 33)
  - 45th Infantry Regiment (8th East Prussian) (8. Ostpreuß. Infanterie-Regiment Nr. 45)
- 10th Light Regiment of Horse (Jäger-Regiment zu Pferde Nr. 10)
- 2nd Field Artillery Brigade (2. Feldartillerie-Brigade)
  - 1st Field Artillery Regiment "Prince August of Prussia" (1st Lithuanian) (Feldartillerie-Regiment Prinz August von Preußen (1. Litthau.) Nr. 1)
  - 37th Field Artillery Regiment (2nd Lithuanian) (2. Litthau. Feldartillerie-Regiment Nr. 37)
- 2nd Company, 1st Engineer Battalion "Prince Radziwill" (East Prussian) (2./Pionier-Bataillon Prinz Radziwill (Ostpreuß.) Nr. 1)
- 3rd Company, 1st Engineer Battalion "Prince Radziwill" (East Prussian) (3./Pionier-Bataillon Prinz Radziwill (Ostpreuß.) Nr. 1)

== Late World War I organization ==
Divisions underwent many changes during the war, with regiments moving from division to division, and some being destroyed and rebuilt. During the war, most divisions became triangular - one infantry brigade with three infantry regiments rather than two infantry brigades of two regiments (a "square division"). An artillery commander replaced the artillery brigade headquarters, the cavalry was further reduced, the engineer contingent was increased, and a divisional signals command was created. The 2nd Infantry Division's order of battle on April 12, 1918, was as follows:

- 3rd Infantry Brigade (3. Infanterie-Brigade)
  - 4th Grenadier Regiment "King Frederick the Great" (3rd East Prussian) (Grenadier-Regiment König Friedrich der Große (3. Ostpreuß.) Nr. 4)
  - 33rd Fusilier Regiment "Graf Roon" (East Prussian) (Füsilier-Regiment Graf Roon (Ostpreuß.) Nr. 33)
  - 44th Infantry Regiment "Graf Dönhoff" (7th East Prussian) (Infanterie-Regiment Graf Dönhoff (7. Ostpreuß.) Nr. 44)
- 2nd Squadron, 10th Light Regiment of Horse (2. Eskadron/Jäger-Regiment zu Pferde Nr. 10)
- Artillery Commander No. 2 (Artillerie-Kommandeur 2)
  - 1st Field Artillery Regiment "Prince August of Prussia" (1st Lithuanian) (Feldartillerie-Regiment Prinz August von Preußen (1. Litthau.) Nr. 1)
  - 2nd Battalion, 11th Reserve Foot Artillery Regiment (II.Bataillon/Reserve-Fußartillerie-Regiment Nr. 11)
- Staff, 1st Engineer Battalion "Prince Radziwill" (East Prussian) (Stab Pionier-Bataillon Prinz Radziwill (Ostpreuß.) Nr. 1)
  - 2nd Company, 1st Engineer Battalion "Prince Radziwill" (East Prussian) (2./Pionier-Bataillon Prinz Radziwill (Ostpreuß.) Nr. 1)
  - 4th Company, 1st Engineer Battalion "Prince Radziwill" (East Prussian) (3./Pionier-Bataillon Prinz Radziwill (Ostpreuß.) Nr. 1)
  - 2nd Mortar Company (Minenwerfer-Kompanie Nr. 2)
- Divisional Signals Commander No. 2 (Divisions-Nachrichten-Kommandeur 2)
