= II Cavalry Corps (German Empire) =

II Cavalry Corps (Höheres Kavallerie-Kommando Nr 2) Higher Cavalry Command No. 2
- Flag of the Staff of a Generalkommando (1871–1918)
- Active: 2 August 1914-23 January 1915
- Disbanded: 23 January 1915
- Country: German Empire
- Branch: Army
- Type: Cavalry
- Size: Approximately 22,000 (on mobilisation)
- Engagements: First World War

Insignia
- Abbreviation: HKK 2

The II Cavalry Corps (German: Höheres Kavallerie-Kommando 2 / HKK 2 literally: Higher Cavalry Command 2) was a formation of the German Army in the First World War. The corps was formed on mobilization of the German Army in August 1914 and dissolved 23 January 1915 as the onset of trench warfare in the west negated the requirement for large cavalry formations. It was commanded throughout its existence by General der Kavallerie Georg von der Marwitz.

== Combat chronicle ==
Initially on the Western Front with the 2nd, 4th and 9th Cavalry Divisions preceding the 1st and 2nd Armies. Withdrawn to Belgium at the end of November 1914; dissolved 23 January 1915.

== Order of Battle on mobilisation ==
The Corps consisted of three cavalry divisions (with seven Jäger battalions attached) without corps troops; in supply and administration matters, the cavalry divisions were autonomous. The commander was only concerned with tactics and strategy, hence his title of Senior Cavalry Commander Höherer Kavallerie-Kommandeur.

On formation in August 1914, the corps consisted of:

- 2nd Cavalry Division
- 4th Cavalry Division
- 9th Cavalry Division
- Guards Jäger Battalion
- Guards Schützen Battalion
- 3rd Jäger Battalion
- 4th Jäger Battalion
- 7th Jäger Battalion
- 9th Jäger Battalion
- 10th Jäger Battalion

Each cavalry division consisted of three cavalry brigades (six regiments each of four squadrons), a horse artillery detachment (Abteilung) with three four-gun batteries, a machine gun detachment (company sized, six machine-guns), plus pioneers, signals and a motor vehicle column. A more detailed Table of Organisation and Equipment can be seen here. The Jäger battalions each consisted of four light infantry companies, a machine gun company (six machine-guns), a cyclist company and a motorised vehicle column.

== Commanders ==
II Cavalry Corps was commanded throughout its existence by General der Kavallerie Georg von der Marwitz.

== See also ==
- German Army (German Empire)
- German Army order of battle (1914)
- German cavalry in World War I
- TOE, German Cavalry Division, August 1914

== Bibliography ==
- Cron, Hermann (2002) [1937]. Imperial German Army 1914–18: Organisation, Structure, Orders-of-Battle [Geschichte des deutschen Heeres im Weltkriege 1914–1918, pub. K. Siegismund, Berlin] (trans. repr. ed.). Helion & Co. ISBN 1-874622-70-1.
