= 5th Cavalry Division (German Empire) =

5th Cavalry Division (5. Kavallerie-Division)
- Flag of the Staff of a Division (1871–1918)
- Active: 2 August 1914 – 27 February 1918
- Disbanded: 27 February 1918
- Country: German Empire
- Branch: Army
- Type: Cavalry
- Size: Approximately 5,000 (on mobilisation)
- Engagements: World War I

The 5th Cavalry Division (5. Kavallerie-Division) was a unit of the German Army in World War I. The division was formed on the mobilization of the German Army in August 1914. The division was dissolved in February 1918.

== Combat chronicle ==
It was initially assigned to I Cavalry Corps, which preceded the 3rd Army on the Western Front. In October 1914, it was transferred to the Eastern Front. From 14 July 1915 to 1 September 1915, it was designated as Cavalry Corps Hendebreck. It was dismounted in October 1916 and dissolved on 27 February 1918.

A more detailed combat chronicle can be found at the German-language version of this article.

== Order of Battle on mobilisation ==
On formation, in August 1914, the component units of the division were:

- 9th Cavalry Brigade (from V Corps District)
  - 4th (1st Silesian) Dragoons "von Bredow"
  - 10th (Posen) Uhlans "Prince August of Württemberg"
- 11th Cavalry Brigade (from VI Corps District)
  - 1st (Silesian) Life Cuirassiers "Great Elector"
  - 8th (2nd Silesian) Dragoons "King Frederick III"
- 12th Cavalry Brigade (from VI Corps District)
  - 4th (1st Silesian) Hussars "von Schill"
  - 6th (2nd Silesian) Hussars "Count Götzen"
- Horse Artillery Abteilung of the 5th (1st Lower Silesian) Field Artillery "von Podbielski" Regiment
- 1st Machine Gun Detachment
- Pioneer Detachment
- Signals Detachment
  - Heavy Wireless Station 3
  - Light Wireless Station 3
  - Light Wireless Station 4
- Cavalry Motorised Vehicle Column 5

See: Table of Organisation and Equipment

== Changes in organization ==
- 9th Cavalry Brigade became independent on 26 December 1916
- 11th Cavalry Brigade joined Guard Cavalry Division on 23 March 1918
- 12th Cavalry Brigade became independent on 20 February 1918

== See also ==
- German Army (German Empire)
- German cavalry in World War I
- German Army order of battle (1914)

== Bibliography ==
- Cron, Hermann (2002). Imperial German Army 1914–18: Organisation, Structure, Orders-of-Battle [first published: 1937]. Helion & Co. ISBN 1-874622-70-1.
- Ellis, John; Cox, Michael (1993). The World War I Databook. Aurum Press Ltd. ISBN 1-85410-766-6.
