= Guards Cavalry Division (German Empire) =

Unit of the Prussian Army

Guards Cavalry Division (Garde-Kavallerie-Division)
- Flag of the Staff of a Division (1871–1918)
- Active: pre-1914–19
- Disbanded: 1919
- Country: Kingdom of Prussia; German Empire
- Branch: Prussian Army; Imperial German Army
- Type: Cavalry
- Size: Division; Approx. 5,000 (on mobilisation)
- Part of: Guards Corps
- Garrison/HQ: Berlin
- Engagements: World War I

The Guards Cavalry Division (Garde-Kavallerie-Division) was a guards cavalry division unit of the Prussian Army that was stationed in Berlin. The division was a part of the Guards Corps (Gardekorps).

== Pre-war Order of Battle ==
Before the outbreak of World War I, the component units of the division were:

- 1st Guards Cavalry Brigade
  - Gardes du Corps
  - Guards Cuirassiers
- 2nd Guards Cavalry Brigade
  - 1st Guards Uhlans
  - 3rd Guards Uhlans
- 3rd Guards Cavalry Brigade
  - 1st Guards Dragoons "Queen of Great Britain and Ireland"
  - 2nd Guards Dragoons "Empress Alexandra of Russia"
- 4th Guards Cavalry Brigade
  - Life Guards Hussars
  - 2nd Guards Uhlans

== Combat chronicle ==
The division was initially assigned to I Cavalry Corps, which preceded the 3rd Army on the Western Front. It served on the Western Front until December 1914, then undertook frontier guard duties against Holland until 30 June 1915, when it relocated to Russia. From 16 March 1918 to 9 April 1918, it was dismounted, re-formed and trained on the Zossen troop training ground. Thereafter, it served as the Guard Cavalry Schützen Division on the Western Front. It was in Artois until May 1918, then Champagne / Aisne. By the end of the war, it was serving under VI Reserve Corps, 1st Army, Heeresgruppe Deutscher Kronprinz on the Western Front.

== Order of Battle on mobilization ==
At the outbreak of the European war, the 4th Guards Cavalry Brigade was dissolved, and its component regiments were assigned as divisional cavalry to the 1st Guards Infantry Division (Life Guard Hussars) and 2nd Guards Infantry Division (2nd Guard Uhlans). With the addition of support units, the Division's structure was:

- 1st Guards Cavalry Brigade
  - Gardes du Corps
  - Guards Cuirassiers
- 2nd Guards Cavalry Brigade
  - 1st Guards Uhlans
  - 3rd Guards Uhlans
- 3rd Guards Cavalry Brigade
  - 1st Guards Dragoons "Queen of Great Britain and Ireland"
  - 2nd Guards Dragoons "Empress Alexandra of Russia"
- Horse Artillery Abteilung of the 1st Guards Field Artillery Regiment
- 1st Guard Machine Gun Detachment
- Pioneer Detachment
- Signals Detachment
  - Heavy Wireless Station 2
  - Light Wireless Station 1
  - Light Wireless Station 2
- Cavalry Motorised Vehicle Column 10

See: Table of Organisation and Equipment

== Guards Cavalry Rifle Division ==
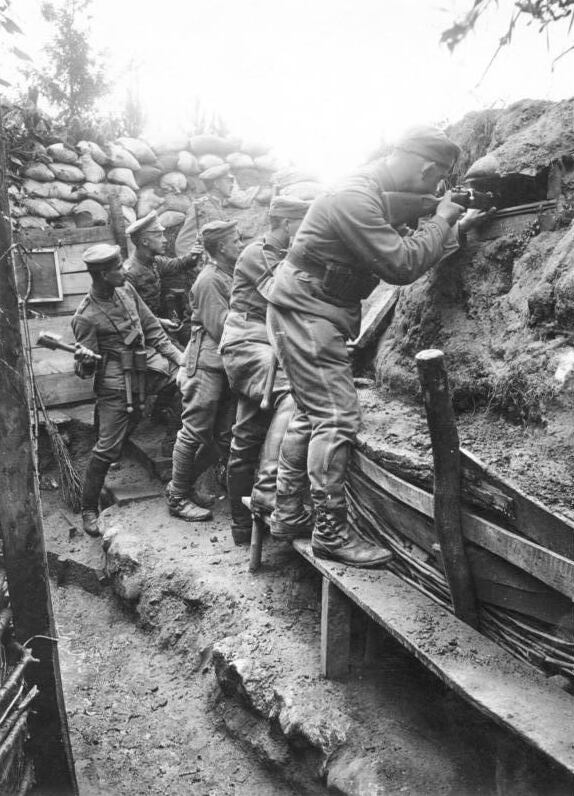
German cavalry of the 11th Reserve Hussar Regiment in a trench in France in 1916

The Guards Cavalry Division was extensively reorganised in the course of the war, culminating in its conversion to a Cavalry Rifle (Kavallerie-Schützen) Division, that is to say, dismounted cavalry. Here, the cavalry brigades were renamed as Cavalry Rifle Commands and performed a similar role to that of an infantry regiment command. Likewise, the cavalry regiments became Cavalry Rifle Regiments and were allocated the role of an infantry battalion, with their squadrons acting as infantry companies. However, these units were much weaker than normal infantry formations (for example, a Rifle squadron had a strength of just four officers and 109 other ranks, including NCOs, considerably smaller than that of an infantry company).

- 1st Guards Cavalry Brigade became independent on 9 April 1917
- 2nd Guards Cavalry Brigade became independent on 6 June 1916
- 3rd Guards Cavalry Brigade became independent on 18 October 1916
- 19th Cavalry Brigade joined from 9th Cavalry Division on 8 April 1917 and became independent on 12 February 1918
- 11th Cavalry Brigade joined from 5th Cavalry Division on 23 March 1918 and renamed as 11th Cavalry Rifle Command on 8 May 1918
- 14th Cavalry Brigade joined from 9th Cavalry Division on 23 February 1918 and renamed as 14th Cavalry Rifle Command on 8 May 1918
- 38th Cavalry Brigade joined from 8th Cavalry Division on 20 April 1918 and renamed as 38th Cavalry Rifle Command on 8 May 1918

== See also ==
- German Army (German Empire)
- German cavalry in World War I
- German Army order of battle (1914)

== Bibliography ==
- Cron, Hermann (2002). Imperial German Army 1914-18: Organisation, Structure, Orders-of-Battle [first published: 1937]. Helion & Co. ISBN 1-874622-70-1.
- Ellis, John; Cox, Michael (1993). The World War I Databook. Aurum Press Ltd. ISBN 1-85410-766-6.
- Histories of Two Hundred and Fifty-One Divisions of the German Army which Participated in the War (1914-1918), compiled from records of Intelligence section of the General Staff, American Expeditionary Forces, at General Headquarters, Chaumont, France 1919. The London Stamp Exchange Ltd. 1989 [1920]. ISBN 0-948130-87-3.
- The German Forces in the Field; 7th Revision, 11th November 1918; Compiled by the General Staff, War Office. Imperial War Museum, London and the Battery Press. 1995 [1918]. ISBN 978-1-870423-95-3.
