= 22nd Division (German Empire) =

22nd Division (22. Division); in 1870-71 and from August 2, 1914, 22nd Infantry Division (22. Infanterie-Division)
- Active: 11 October 1866-1919
- Country: Prussia/German Empire
- Branch: Imperial German Army
- Type: Infantry (in peacetime included cavalry)
- Part of: XI. Army Corps (XI. Armeekorps)
- Garrison/HQ: Kassel
- Engagements: Franco-Prussian War: Battle of Woerth; Battle of Sedan; Siege of Paris; First Battle of Orléans; Battle of Loigny-Poupry; Second Battle of Orléans; Battle of Le Mans; World War I: Battle of Liège; First Battle of the Masurian Lakes; Gorlice-Tarnów Offensive; Romanian Campaign; German spring offensive; Second Battle of the Somme; Second Battle of the Marne

The 22nd Division (22. Division) was a unit of the Prussian/German Army. It was formed on October 11, 1866, and was headquartered in Kassel. The division was subordinated in peacetime to the XI Army Corps (XI. Armeekorps). The division was disbanded in 1919 during the demobilization of the German Army after World War I.

== Recruitment ==
The division was recruited in the formerly independent Electorate of Hesse (Kurhessen), which had been incorporated into Prussia after the Austro-Prussian War, in the Principality of Waldeck, and in the Thuringian states. Until 1899, including during the Franco-Prussian War, it was predominantly from Thuringia, but many Thuringian units went to the 38th Division when that division was formed in 1899.

== Combat chronicle ==
During the Franco-Prussian War, as the 22nd Infantry Division it fought in the opening battle of Woerth and the major battle of Sedan. It then participated in the Siege of Paris. Subsequently, it saw action in the Loire campaign, including the battles of 1st Orléans, Loigny-Poupry, 2nd Orléans, and Le Mans.

In World War I, again as the 22nd Infantry Division, it fought initially on the Western Front, including in the Battle of Liège. It was soon sent to the Eastern Front, where it remained until October 1917. It fought in the First Battle of the Masurian Lakes and the Gorlice-Tarnów Offensive, as well as the Brusilov Offensive and Kerensky Offensive. After returning to the Western Front, it saw action in the 1918 German spring offensive, including the Second Battle of the Somme and the Second Battle of the Marne. Allied intelligence noted that the division had good morale, but in 1918 rated it third class, albeit better on the defensive.

== Order of battle in the Franco-Prussian War ==
During wartime, the 22nd Division, like other regular German divisions, was redesignated an infantry division. The organization of the 22nd Infantry Division in 1870 at the beginning of the Franco-Prussian War was as follows:

- 43. Infanterie-Brigade
  - Infanterie-Regiment Nr. 32
  - Infanterie-Regiment Nr. 95
- 44. Infanterie-Brigade
  - Infanterie-Regiment Nr. 83
  - Infanterie-Regiment Nr. 94
- Husaren-Regiment Nr. 13

The 32nd, 94th and 95th Infantry Regiments were from the Thuringian states, while the 83rd Infantry Regiment was from the Electorate of Hesse and included a battalion from Waldeck.

== Pre-World War I organization ==
German divisions underwent various organizational changes after the Franco-Prussian War. With the creation of the 38th Division, most Thuringian elements were transferred to the new division and replaced with the Electorate of Hesse units (the 167th Upper Alsatian Infantry Regiment, despite its name, was recruited in the Electorate of Hesse and Prussian Saxony). The organization of the 22nd Division in 1914, shortly before the outbreak of World War I, was as follows:

- 43. Infanterie-Brigade
  - 2. Kurhessisches Infanterie-Regiment Nr. 82
  - Infanterie-Regiment von Wittich (3. Kurhessisches) Nr. 83
- 44.Infanterie-Brigade
  - 2. Thüringisches Infanterie-Regiment Nr. 32
  - 1. Ober-Elsässiches Infanterie-Regiment Nr. 167
- 22. Kavallerie-Brigade
  - Dragoner-Regiment Freiherr von Manteuffel (Rheinisches) Nr. 5
  - Husaren-Regiment Landgraf Friedrich II. von Hessen-Homburg (2. Kurhessisches) Nr. 14
- 22. Feldartillerie-Brigade
  - 1. Kurhessisches Feldartillerie-Regiment Nr. 11
  - 2. Kurhessisches Feldartillerie-Regiment Nr. 47

== Order of battle on mobilization ==
On mobilization in August 1914 at the beginning of World War I, most divisional cavalry, including brigade headquarters, was withdrawn to form cavalry divisions or split up among divisions as reconnaissance units. Divisions received engineer companies and other support units from their higher headquarters. The 22nd Division was again renamed the 22nd Infantry Division and its initial wartime organization was as follows:

- 43. Infanterie-Brigade
  - 2. Kurhessisches Infanterie-Regiment Nr. 82
  - Infanterie-Regiment von Wittich (3. Kurhessisches) Nr. 83
- 44.Infanterie-Brigade
  - 2. Thüringisches Infanterie-Regiment Nr. 32
  - 1. Ober-Elsässiches Infanterie-Regiment Nr. 167
  - Kurhessisches Jäger-Bataillon Nr. 11
- 1.Halbregiment/Kürassier-Regiment Kaiser Nikolas I. von Rußland (Brandenburgisches) Nr. 6
- 22. Feldartillerie-Brigade
  - 1. Kurhessisches Feldartillerie-Regiment Nr. 11
  - 2. Kurhessisches Feldartillerie-Regiment Nr. 47
- 1.Kompanie/Kurhessisches Pionier-Bataillon Nr. 11

== Late World War I organization ==
Divisions underwent many changes during the war, with regiments moving from division to division, and some being destroyed and rebuilt. During the war, most divisions became triangular - one infantry brigade with three infantry regiments rather than two infantry brigades of two regiments (a "square division"). An artillery commander replaced the artillery brigade headquarters, the cavalry was further reduced, the engineer contingent was increased, and a divisional signals command was created. The 22nd Infantry Division's order of battle on May 29, 1918, was as follows:

- 43. Infanterie-Brigade
  - 2. Kurhessisches Infanterie-Regiment Nr. 82
  - Infanterie-Regiment von Wittich (3. Kurhessisches) Nr. 83
  - 1. Ober-Elsässiches Infanterie-Regiment Nr. 167
- 6.Eskadron/Kürassier-Regiment Kaiser Nikolas I. von Rußland (Brandenburgisches) Nr. 6
- Artillerie-Kommandeur 22
  - 1. Kurhessisches Feldartillerie-Regiment Nr. 11
  - Fußartillerie-Bataillon Nr. 50
- Pionier-Bataillon Nr. 128
  - 1.Kompanie/Kurhessisches Pionier-Bataillon Nr. 11
  - 2.Kompanie/Kurhessisches Pionier-Bataillon Nr. 11
  - Minenwerfer-Kompanie Nr. 22
- Divisions-Nachrichten-Kommandeur 22
