= 3rd Royal Bavarian Chevau-légers "Duke Charles Theodore" =

Military unit

The 3rd Royal Bavarian Chevau-légers "Duke Charles Theodore" (Königlich Bayerisches Chevaulegers-Regiment „Herzog Karl Theodor“ Nr. 3) were a light cavalry regiment of the Royal Bavarian Army. The regiment was originally formed in 1724 and fought in numerous wars until finally in World War I. The regiment was disbanded in 1919.

== See also ==
- List of Imperial German cavalry regiments
