= 7th Royal Bavarian Chevau-légers =

The 7th Royal Bavarian Chevau-légers (German: Königlich Bayerisches 7. Chevaulegers-Regiment „Prinz Alfons“) were a light cavalry regiment of the Royal Bavarian Army. The regiment was formed in 1905 and fought in World War I. The regiment was disbanded in 1919.

== History ==
Chevaulegers were originally a branch of light cavalry. In the Kingdom of Bavaria, however, they formed the medium cavalry from 1813 onwards and were considered a characteristic branch of the Bavarian Army until the end of the monarchy.

The regiment was established on 1 October 1905, in Straubing as the 7th Chevaulegers Regiment. It was formed as follows:

- 1st Squadron from the Mounted Jäger Squadron of the I Army Corps,
- 2nd Squadron from the Mounted Jäger Squadron of the III Army Corps (1st Chevaulegers Regiment in Nuremberg),
- 3rd Squadron from contributions from all Chevaulegers regiments,
- 4th Squadron on 1 October 1906, from the 3rd Squadron of the 1st Chevaulegers Regiment.

Anton Manz was appointed the regiment's first commander on 1 October 1905. The regiment received a new standard, resembling the infantry flags. The ceremonial nailing of the standard took place on 24 October 1905. In 1907, several Chevaulegers volunteered for the Schutztruppe in German South West Africa, two of whom were killed in action. On 20 August 1907, Ludwig von Gropper was entrusted with command of the regiment. On 24 September 1909, General of the Cavalry Prince Alfons of Bavaria was awarded the honorary title Regimentschef, the regiment was renamed the 7th Chevaulegers Regiment "Prince Alfons" on the same day. In 1910, Wilhelm Anton Ritter und Edler von Poschinger was initially entrusted with commanding the regiment and was appointed commander the following year.

At the beginning of the First World War, the regiment was assigned to the 5th Infantry Division as divisional cavalry and had a combat strength of 35 officers, 600 non-commissioned officers and men, and 700 horses. In August/September 1914, the regiment was deployed to France, then deployed between the Meuse and Moselle.

== Notable members ==
- Max Erwin von Scheubner-Richter

== See also ==
- List of Imperial German cavalry regiments
