= V Cavalry Corps (German Empire) =

German Army formation in WWI

V Cavalry Corps (Höhere Kavallerie-Kommando Nr 5) Higher Cavalry Command No. 5
- Flag of the Staff of a Generalkommando (1871–1918)
- Active: 3 June 1916-1919
- Disbanded: 1919
- Country: German Empire
- Branch: Army
- Type: Cavalry
- Engagements: World War I

Insignia
- Abbreviation: HKK 5

The V Cavalry Corps (German: Höhere Kavallerie-Kommando 5 / HKK 5 literally: Higher Cavalry Command 5) was a formation of the German Army in World War I.

== V Cavalry Corps ==
During the Courland Offensive a wide gap opened between the Army of the Niemen and 10th Army. Set up by the Army of the Niemen as temporary Cavalry Corps Schmettow, commanded by Generalleutnant Egon Graf von Schmettow. Established 18 August 1915. Redesignated 20 November 1916 as 58th Corps (z.b.V.).

== 58th Corps ==
58th Corps (z.b.V.) was formed on 20 November 1916 by the redesignation of V Cavalry Corps. As the need for large mounted cavalry formations diminished as the war went on, the existing Cavalry Corps increasingly took on the characteristics of a normal Corps Command. This culminated in them being redesignated as "General Commands for Special Use" Generalkommandos zur besonderen Verwendung (Genkdo z.b.V.).

By the end of the war, the Corps was serving on the Western Front as part of the 5th Army with the following composition:

- 240th Division
- 15th Bavarian Division
- 52nd Division
- 31st Division

== Commanders ==
V Cavalry Corps / 58th Corps had the following commanders during its existence:

Commander	From	To
Generalleutnant Egon Graf von Schmettow	21 August 1915	6 February 1918
Generalleutnant Alfred von Kleist	6 February 1918	end of war

== See also ==
- German Army (German Empire)
- German Army order of battle, Western Front (1918)
- German cavalry in World War I

== Bibliography ==
- Cron, Hermann (2002). Imperial German Army 1914-18: Organisation, Structure, Orders-of-Battle [first published: 1937]. Helion & Co. ISBN 1-874622-70-1.
- Ellis, John; Cox, Michael (1993). The World War I Databook. Aurum Press Ltd. ISBN 1-85410-766-6.
