= III Cavalry Corps (German Empire) =

World War I German military corps

III Cavalry Corps (Höheres Kavallerie-Kommando Nr 3) Higher Cavalry Command No. 3
- Flag of the Staff of a Generalkommando (1871–1918)
- Active: 2 August 1914-1919
- Disbanded: 1919
- Country: German Empire
- Branch: Army
- Type: Cavalry
- Size: Approximately 17,000 (on mobilisation)
- Engagements: World War I

Insignia
- Abbreviation: HKK 3

The III Cavalry Corps (German: Höheres Kavallerie-Kommando 3 / HKK 3 literally: Higher Cavalry Command 3) was a formation of the German Army in World War I. The corps was formed on mobilization of the German Army in August 1914 and disbanded in 1919 during the demobilization of the German Army after World War I.

== III Cavalry Corps ==
Initially on the Western Front with 7th, 8th and Bavarian Cavalry Divisions preceding 6th Army. Transferred to the East on 9 September 1914 and assigned to 9th Army with just 8th Cavalry Division. Redesignated 20 November 1916 as 57th Corps (z.b.V.).

== 57th Corps ==
57th Corps (z.b.V.) was formed on 20 November 1916 by the redesignation of III Cavalry Corps. As the need for large mounted cavalry formations diminished as the war went on, the existing Cavalry Corps increasingly took on the characteristics of a normal Corps Command. This culminated in them being redesignated as "General Commands for Special Use" Generalkommandos zur besonderen Verwendung (Genkdo z.b.V.).

By the end of the war, the Corps was serving on the Western Front as part of Armee-Abteilung C with the following composition:

- 8th Landwehr Division
- 255th Division

== Order of Battle on mobilisation ==
Initially, the Corps simply consisted of 3 Cavalry Divisions (with 2 Jäger battalions attached) without any Corps troops; in supply and administration matters, the Cavalry Divisions were entirely autonomous. The commander was only concerned with tactics and strategy, hence his title of Senior Cavalry Commander Höherer Kavallerie-Kommandeur.

On formation in August 1914, the Corps consisted of:

- 7th Cavalry Division
- 8th Cavalry Division
- Bavarian Cavalry Division
- 1st Bavarian Jäger Battalion
- 2nd Bavarian Jäger Battalion

Each cavalry division consisted of 3 cavalry brigades (6 regiments each of 4 squadrons), a horse artillery Abteilung (3 four-gun batteries), a machine gun detachment (company size, 6 MGs), plus pioneers, signals and a motor vehicle column. A more detailed Table of Organisation and Equipment can be seen here. The Jäger battalions each consisted of 4 light infantry companies, 1 machine gun company (6 MGs), 1 cyclist company and a motorised vehicle column.

== Designations ==
The corps was continually redesignated depending upon its role from time to time.

Designation	From	To
Senior Cavalry Command 3	2 August 1914	23 September 1914
Corps Frommel	24 September 1914	2 January 1915
Cavalry Corps Frommel	2 January 1915	14 May 1915
Army Group Frommel	May 1915	1 August 1915
Cavalry Corps Frommel	6 August 1915	7 September 1915
Corps Frommel	8 September 1915	18 November 1916
57th Corps (z.b.V.)	20 November 1916	End of the war

== Commanders ==
III Cavalry Corps / 57th Corps had the following commanders during its existence:

Commander	From	To
General der Kavallerie Rudolf Ritter von Frommel	2 August 1914	7 April 1918
Generalleutnant Bernhard von Hartz	7 April 1918	End of the war

== See also ==
- German Army (German Empire)
- German Army order of battle (1914)
- German Army order of battle, Western Front (1918)
- German cavalry in World War I
- TOE, German Cavalry Division, August 1914

== Bibliography ==
- Cron, Hermann (2002). Imperial German Army 1914-18: Organisation, Structure, Orders-of-Battle [first published: 1937]. Helion & Co. ISBN 1-874622-70-1.
- Ellis, John; Cox, Michael (1993). The World War I Databook. Aurum Press Ltd. ISBN 1-85410-766-6.
