= 9th Cavalry Division (German Empire) =

9th Cavalry Division (9. Kavallerie-Division)
- Flag of the Staff of a Division (1871–1918)
- Active: 2 August 1914 – 3 March 1918
- Disbanded: 3 March 1918
- Country: German Empire
- Branch: Army
- Type: Cavalry
- Size: Approximately 5,000 (on mobilisation)
- Engagements: World War I

The 9th Cavalry Division (9. Kavallerie-Division) was a unit of the German Army in World War I. The division was formed on the mobilization of the German Army in August 1914. The division was dissolved in March 1918.

== Combat chronicle ==
It was initially assigned to II Cavalry Corps, which preceded the 1st and 2nd Armies on the Western Front. On 27 November 1914, it was transferred to Russia. It was dismounted in October 1916 and dissolved on 3 March 1918.

A more detailed combat chronicle can be found at the German-language version of this article.

== Order of Battle on mobilisation ==
On formation, in August 1914, the component units of the division were:

- 13th Cavalry Brigade (from VII Corps District)
  - 4th (Westphalian) Cuirassiers "von Driesen"
  - 8th (1st Westphalian) Hussars "Emperor Nicholas II of Russia"
- 14th Cavalry Brigade (from VII Corps District)
  - 11th (2nd Westphalian) Hussars
  - 5th (Westphalian) Uhlans
- 19th Cavalry Brigade (from X Corps District)
  - 19th (Oldenburg) Dragoons
  - 13th (1st Hannover) King's Uhlans
- Horse Artillery Abteilung of the 10th (1st Hannover) Field Artillery "von Scharnhorst" Regiment
- 7th Machine Gun Detachment
- Pioneer Detachment
- Signals Detachment
  - Heavy Wireless Station 21
  - Light Wireless Station 8
  - Light Wireless Station 17
- Cavalry Motorised Vehicle Column 9

See: Table of Organisation and Equipment

== Changes in organization ==
- 13th Cavalry Brigade Staff on 8 February 1916 joined the Warsaw General Government as the Cavalry Inspectorate
- 14th Cavalry Brigade joined Guard Cavalry Division on 23 February 1918
- 19th Cavalry Brigade joined Guard Cavalry Division on 8 April 1917

== See also ==
- German Army (German Empire)
- German cavalry in World War I
- German Army order of battle (1914)

== Bibliography ==
- Cron, Hermann (2002). Imperial German Army 1914–18: Organisation, Structure, Orders-of-Battle [first published: 1937]. Helion & Co. ISBN 1-874622-70-1.
- Ellis, John; Cox, Michael (1993). The World War I Databook. Aurum Press Ltd. ISBN 1-85410-766-6.
