= Guards Cuirassiers (Prussia) =

Prussian army unit

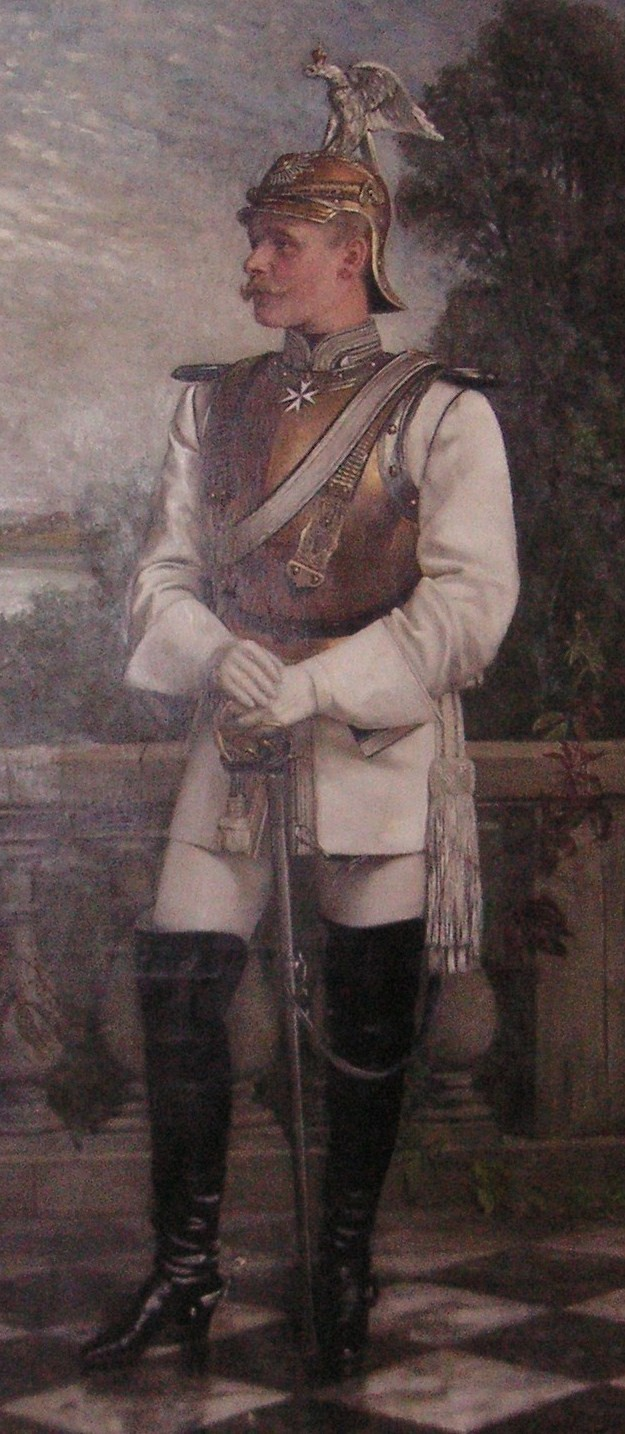
Ferdinand Rogalla von Bieberstein in the parade uniform of the Guards Cuirassiers

The Guards Cuirassiers (German: Garde-Kürassier-Regiment) were a heavy cavalry regiment of the Royal Prussian Army. Formed in 1815 as an Uhlans regiment, it was reorganized as a cuirassiers unit in 1821. The regiment was part of the Guards Cavalry Division and fought in the Second Schleswig War, the Austro-Prussian War, the Franco-Prussian War and World War I. The regiment was disbanded in September 1919.

== See also ==
- List of Imperial German cavalry regiments
