= VI Cavalry Corps (German Empire) =

VI Cavalry Corps (Höhere Kavallerie-Kommando Nr 6) Higher Cavalry Command No. 6
- Flag of the Staff of a Generalkommando (1871–1918)
- Active: June 1915-1919
- Disbanded: 1919
- Country: German Empire
- Branch: Army
- Type: Cavalry
- Engagements: World War I

Insignia
- Abbreviation: HKK 6

The VI Cavalry Corps (German: Höhere Kavallerie-Kommando 6 / HKK 6 literally: Higher Cavalry Command 6) was a formation of the German Army in World War I.

== VI Cavalry Corps ==
During the Courland Offensive a wide gap opened between the Army of the Niemen and 10th Army. Set up by the 10th Army as a temporary Cavalry Corps. Established 18 August 1915. Redesignated 20 November 1916 as 59th Corps (z.b.V.).

== 59th Corps ==
59th Corps (z.b.V.) was formed on 20 November 1916 by the redesignation of VI Cavalry Corps. As the need for large mounted cavalry formations diminished as the war went on, the existing Cavalry Corps increasingly took on the characteristics of a normal Corps Command. This culminated in them being redesignated as "General Commands for Special Use" Generalkommandos zur besonderen Verwendung (Genkdo z.b.V.).

By the end of the war, the Corps was serving on the Western Front as part of Armee-Abteilung A with the following composition:

- 96th Division
- 21st Landwehr Division
- 75th Reserve Division

== Commanders ==
VI Cavalry Corps / 59th Corps had the following commanders during its existence:

Commander	From	To
General der Kavallerie Otto von Garnier	18 August 1915	3 September 1916
Generalleutnant Hermann Brecht	3 September 1916	2 November 1917
Generalleutnant Erich von Redern	2 November 1917	end of war

== See also ==
- German Army (German Empire)
- German Army order of battle, Western Front (1918)
- German cavalry in World War I

== Bibliography ==
- Cron, Hermann (2002). Imperial German Army 1914-18: Organisation, Structure, Orders-of-Battle [first published: 1937]. Helion & Co. ISBN 1-874622-70-1.
- Ellis, John; Cox, Michael (1993). The World War I Databook. Aurum Press Ltd. ISBN 1-85410-766-6.
