= 3rd Mounted Rifles =

Military unit

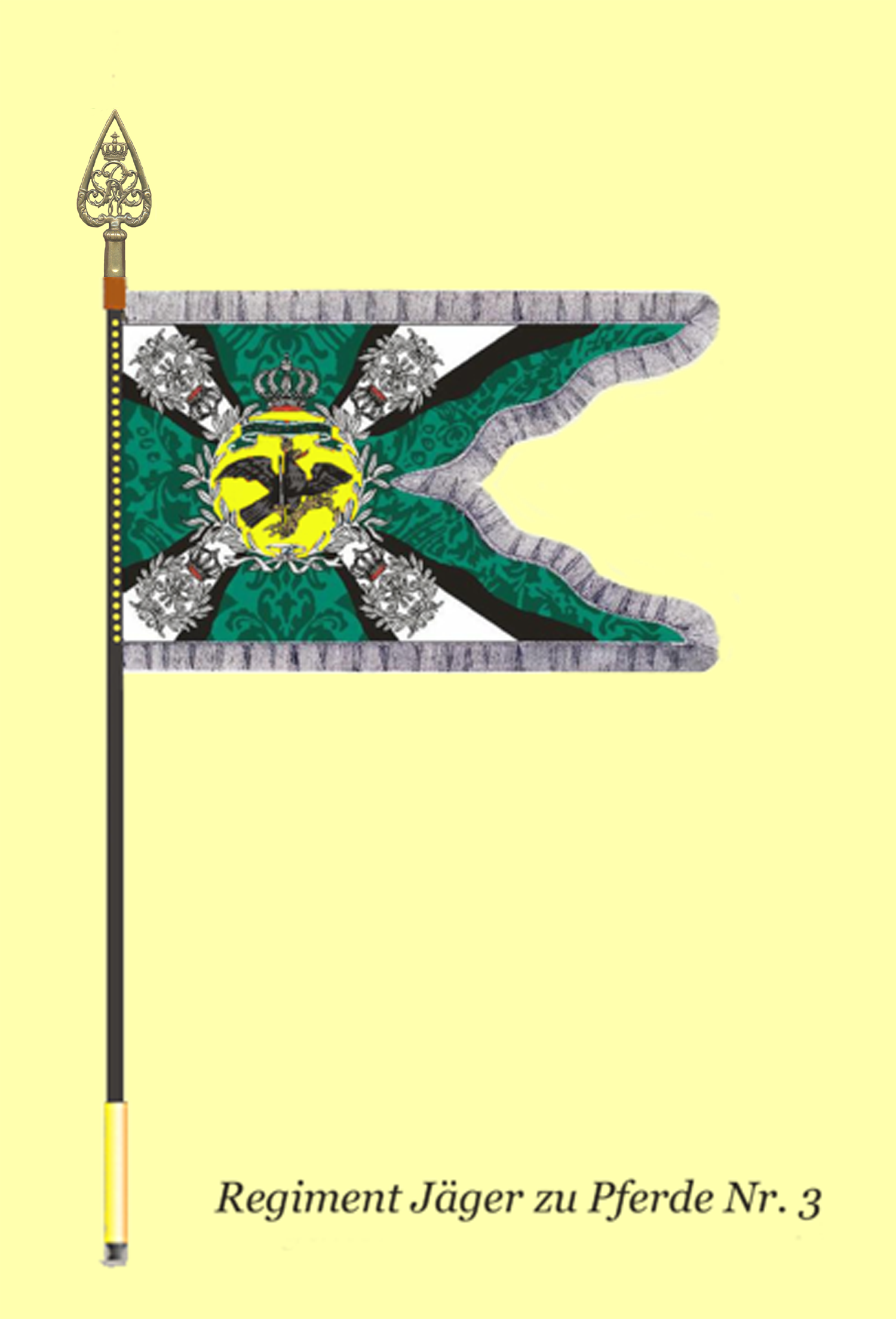
Colors of the royal prussian 3rd Regiment of Mounted Rifles

The 3rd Mounted Rifles were a light cavalry regiment of the Royal Prussian Army. The regiment was formed 1 October 1905 in Colmar.

== See also ==
- List of Imperial German cavalry regiments
