= 11th Mounted Rifles =

Military unit

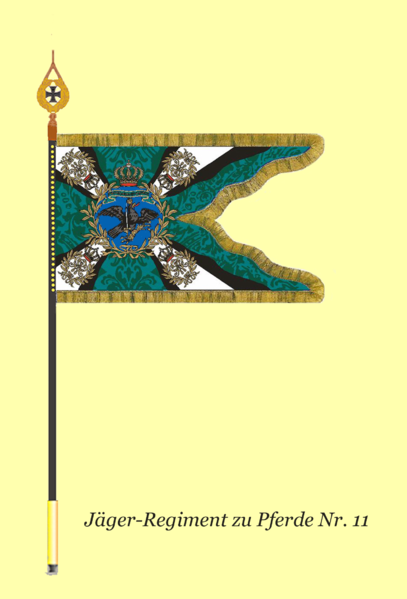
Regimental colors

The Mounted Jäger Regiment No. 11 (German: Jäger-Regiment zu Pferde Nr. 11) was a light cavalry (mounted Jäger) regiment of the Royal Prussian Army.

== History ==
On 1 October 1913 (founding day), the establishment of the Jäger Regiment on Horse No. 11 with five squadrons was ordered by Supreme Cabinet Order (A.K.O.). The regiment was stationed in Tarnowitz and together with the Uhlan Regiment “von Katzler” (Silesian) No. 2 formed the 44th Cavalry Brigade in Gleiwitz under Colonel Louis Hugo Max Albert von Mutius.

Following WWI mobilization of the Imperial German Army in July 1914, the regiment under Emmo Maria Max Wellhausen von Roden assumed responsibility for protecting the border with Russia in Upper Silesia. It then transferred to the west, where it participated in the battles of Neufchâteau and Tintigny. Until August 1915, the regiment performed courier and dispatch duties, until September 1915, when it was deployed as infantry in the Vimy and Arras area.

At the beginning of 1916, the regiment was transferred to the Eastern Front, where it was used for border security in Courland, Lithuania, and Russian Poland. This included combating groups of armed Russian deserters and other armed civilian groups not considered combatants.

On 31 January 1919, the regiment was disbanded in Tarnowitz. The tradition of the regiment was taken over in 1921 by the training squadron of the 8th (Prussian) Cavalry Regiment in Brieg within the Reichswehr.

== See also ==
- List of Imperial German cavalry regiments
