= 8th Royal Bavarian Chevau-légers =

Military unit

The 8th Royal Bavarian Chevau-légers (Königlich Bayerisches Chevaulegers-Regiment Nr. 8) were a light cavalry regiment of the Royal Bavarian Army. The regiment was formed in 1905 and fought in World War I. The regiment was disbanded in 1919.

== See also ==
- List of Imperial German cavalry regiments
