= 38th Division (German Empire) =

38th Division (38. Division); from August 2, 1914, 38th Infantry Division (38. Infanterie-Division)
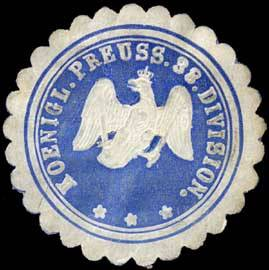
- Seal mark
- Active: 1 April 1899 – 1919
- Country: Prussia/Germany
- Branch: Imperial German Army
- Type: Infantry (in peacetime included cavalry)
- Size: Approx. 15,000 men
- Part of: XI. Army Corps (XI. Armeekorps)
- Garrison/HQ: Erfurt
- Engagements: World War I: Eastern Front; First Battle of the Masurian Lakes; Gorlice-Tarnów Offensive; Western Front; Battle of Verdun; Battle of the Somme; Battle of Arras; Battle of Passchendaele; Hundred Days Offensive

The 38th Division (38. Division) was a unit of the Prussian/German Army. It was formed on April 1, 1899, and was headquartered in Erfurt. The division was subordinated in peacetime to the XI Army Corps (XI. Armeekorps). The division was disbanded in 1919 during the demobilization of the German Army after World War I.

== Recruitment ==
The division was recruited primarily in Thuringia: its Prussian elements were from Prussian Saxony while its other elements were from the smaller Thuringian states. The 71st Infantry was from Prussian Saxony and the Principality of Schwarzburg-Sondershausen. The 94th Infantry was the regiment of the Grand Duchy of Saxe-Weimar-Eisenach. The 95th Infantry was from the Duchies of Saxe-Coburg-Gotha and Saxe-Meiningen. The 96th Infantry had one battalion from Prussian Saxony, one from the Reuss principalities, and one from Schwarzburg-Rudolstadt.

== Combat chronicle ==
The division began the war on the Western Front, fighting in Belgium and participating in the capture of the fortifications at Namur. It was soon transferred to the Eastern Front, where it saw action in the First Battle of the Masurian Lakes and in the Gorlice-Tarnów Offensive. It was transferred to the Western Front in October 1915, and after a period of fighting along the Aisne, entered the Battle of Verdun in 1916. It then saw action in the later phases of the Battle of the Somme. It remained along the Somme until 1917, and then fought in the battles of Arras and Passchendaele. In 1918, it fought in various defensive battles against Allied offensives and counteroffensives. Allied intelligence rated the division as a good division and considered it second class by 1918.

== Pre-World War I organization ==
The organization of the 38th Division in 1914, shortly before the outbreak of World War I, was as follows:

- 76.Infanterie-Brigade
  - 3. Thüringisches Infanterie-Regiment Nr. 71
  - 6. Thüringisches Infanterie-Regiment Nr. 95
- 83.Infanterie-Brigade
  - Infanterie-Regiment Großherzhog von Sachsen (5. Thüringisches) Nr. 94
  - 7. Thüringisches Infanterie-Regiment Nr. 96
- 38. Kavallerie-Brigade
  - Jäger-Regiment zu Pferde Nr. 2
  - Jäger-Regiment zu Pferde Nr. 6
- 38. Feldartillerie-Brigade
  - 1. Thüringisches Feldartillerie-Regiment Nr. 19
  - 2. Thüringisches Feldartillerie-Regiment Nr. 55
- Landwehr-Inspektion Erfurt

== Order of battle on mobilization ==
On mobilization in August 1914 at the beginning of World War I, most divisional cavalry, including brigade headquarters, was withdrawn to form cavalry divisions or split up among divisions as reconnaissance units. Divisions received engineer companies and other support units from their higher headquarters. The 38th Division was redesignated the 38th Infantry Division. Its initial wartime organization was as follows:

- 76. Infanterie-Brigade
  - 3. Thüringisches Infanterie-Regiment Nr. 71
  - 6. Thüringisches Infanterie-Regiment Nr. 95
- 83. Infanterie-Brigade
  - Infanterie-Regiment Großherzhog von Sachsen (5. Thüringisches) Nr. 94
  - 7. Thüringisches Infanterie-Regiment Nr. 96
- Halbregiment Kürassier-Regiment (Brandenburgisches) Nr. 6
- 38. Feldartillerie-Brigade
  - 1. Thüringisches Feldartillerie-Regiment Nr. 19
  - 2. Thüringisches Feldartillerie-Regiment Nr. 55
- 2.Kompanie/Kurhessisches Pionier-Bataillon Nr. 11
- 3.Kompanie/Kurhessisches Pionier-Bataillon Nr. 11

== Late World War I organization ==
Divisions underwent many changes during the war, with regiments moving from division to division, and some being destroyed and rebuilt. During the war, most divisions became triangular - one infantry brigade with three infantry regiments rather than two infantry brigades of two regiments (a "square division"). An artillery commander replaced the artillery brigade headquarters, the cavalry was further reduced, the engineer contingent was increased, and a divisional signals command was created. The 38th Infantry Division's order of battle on April 20, 1918, was as follows:

- 83. Infanterie-Brigade
  - Infanterie-Regiment Großherzhog von Sachsen (5. Thüringisches) Nr. 94
  - 6. Thüringisches Infanterie-Regiment Nr. 95
  - 7. Thüringisches Infanterie-Regiment Nr. 96
- 3.Eskadron/Kürassier-Regiment (Brandenburgisches) Nr. 6
- Artillerie-Kommandeur 38
  - 1. Thüringisches Feldartillerie-Regiment Nr. 19
  - Fußartillerie-Bataillon Nr. 61
- Stab Pionier-Bataillon Nr. 135
  - 3.Kompanie/Kurhessisches Pionier-Bataillon Nr. 11
  - Pionier-Kompanie Nr. 284
  - Minenwerfer-Kompanie Nr. 38
- Divisions-Nachrichten-Kommandeur 38
