= 10th Mounted Rifles =

Light cavalry regiment of the Royal Prussian Army

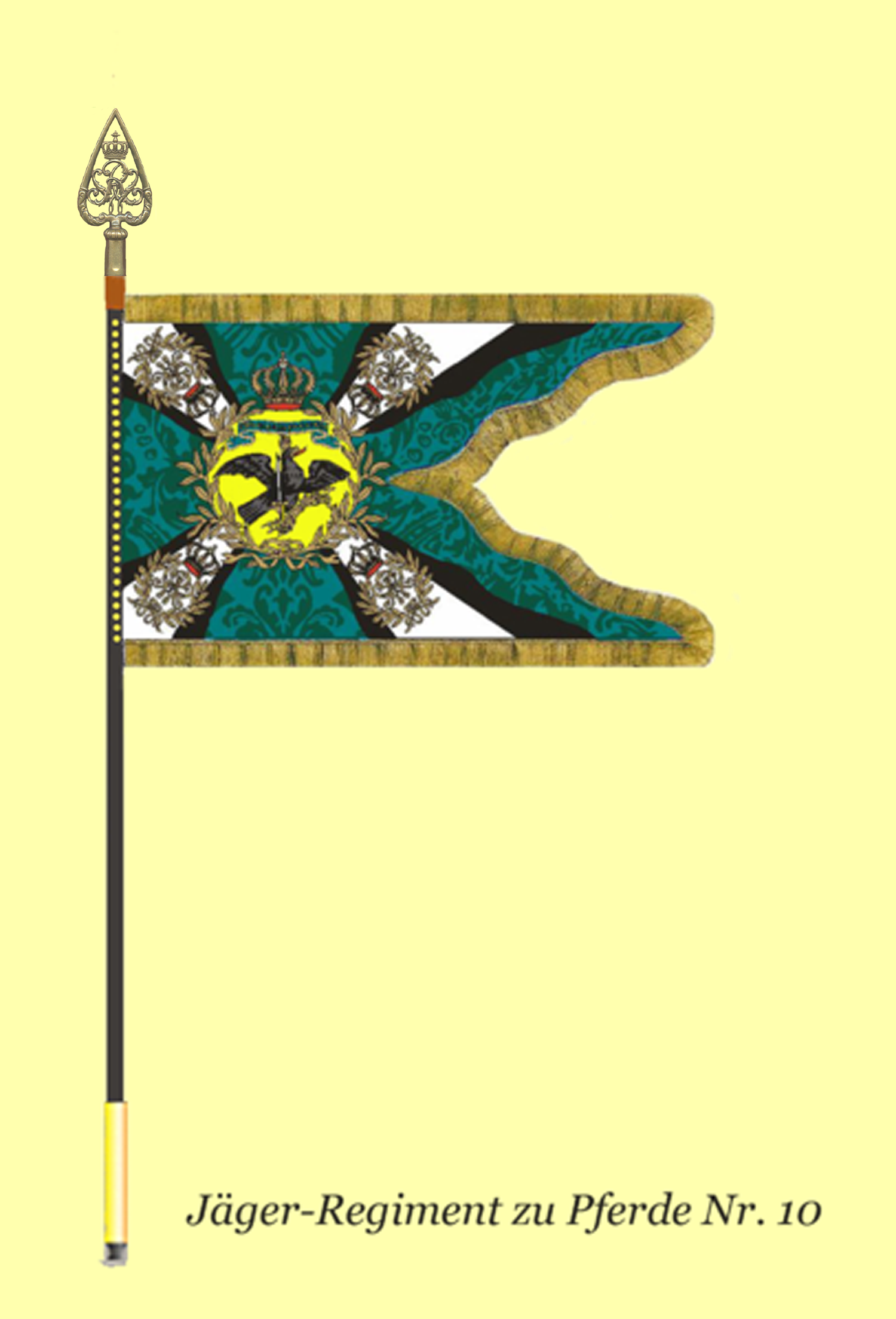
Colors of the Royal Prussian 10th Regiment of Mounted Rifles

The 10th Mounted Rifles were a light cavalry regiment of the Royal Prussian Army. The regiment was formed 1 October 1913 in Angerburg.

== See also ==
- List of Imperial German cavalry regiments
