= 4th Royal Bavarian Chevau-légers "King" =

Light cavalry regiment of the Royal Bavarian Army

The 4th Royal Bavarian Chevau-légers "King" (Königlich Bayerisches Chevaulegers-Regiment „König“ Nr. 4) was a light cavalry regiment of the Royal Bavarian Army. The regiment was formed in 1744 and fought in the Napoleonic Wars, the Austro-Prussian War, the Franco-Prussian War, and World War I. The regiment was disbanded in 1919.

== See also ==
- List of Imperial German cavalry regiments
