= 13th Mounted Rifles =

Military unit

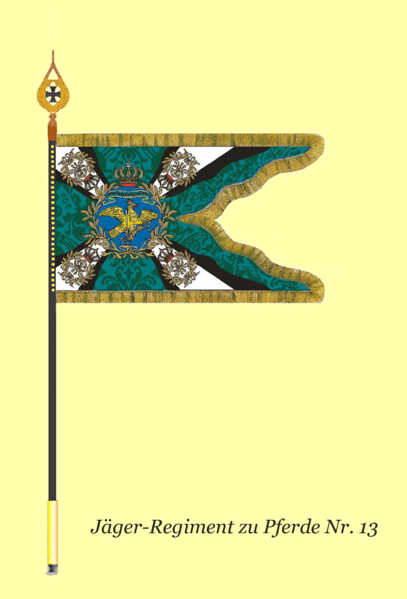
The colors of the 13th Mounted Rifles

The 13th Mounted Rifles were a light cavalry regiment of the Royal Prussian Army. The regiment was formed 1 October 1913 in Saarlouis.

== See also ==
- List of Imperial German cavalry regiments
