= 7th (Magdeburg) Cuirassiers "von Seydlitz" =

Cavalry Regiment of the Prussian Army

The 7th (Magdeburg) Cuirassiers “von Seydlitz” were a heavy cavalry regiment of the Royal Prussian Army. The regiment was formed in 1815. The regiment fought in the War of the Sixth Coalition, the Austro-Prussian War, the Franco-Prussian War and World War I. The regiment was disbanded in 1919.

== See also ==
- List of Imperial German cavalry regiments
