= 6th Mounted Rifles =

Military unit

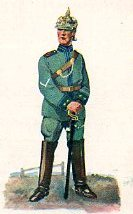
Jäger des Jäger-Regiment zu Pferde Nr. 6

The 6th Mounted Rifles were a light cavalry regiment of the Royal Prussian Army. The regiment was formed 1 October 1910 in Erfurt.

== See also ==
- List of Imperial German cavalry regiments
