= Ferdinand von Kummer =

Prussian general

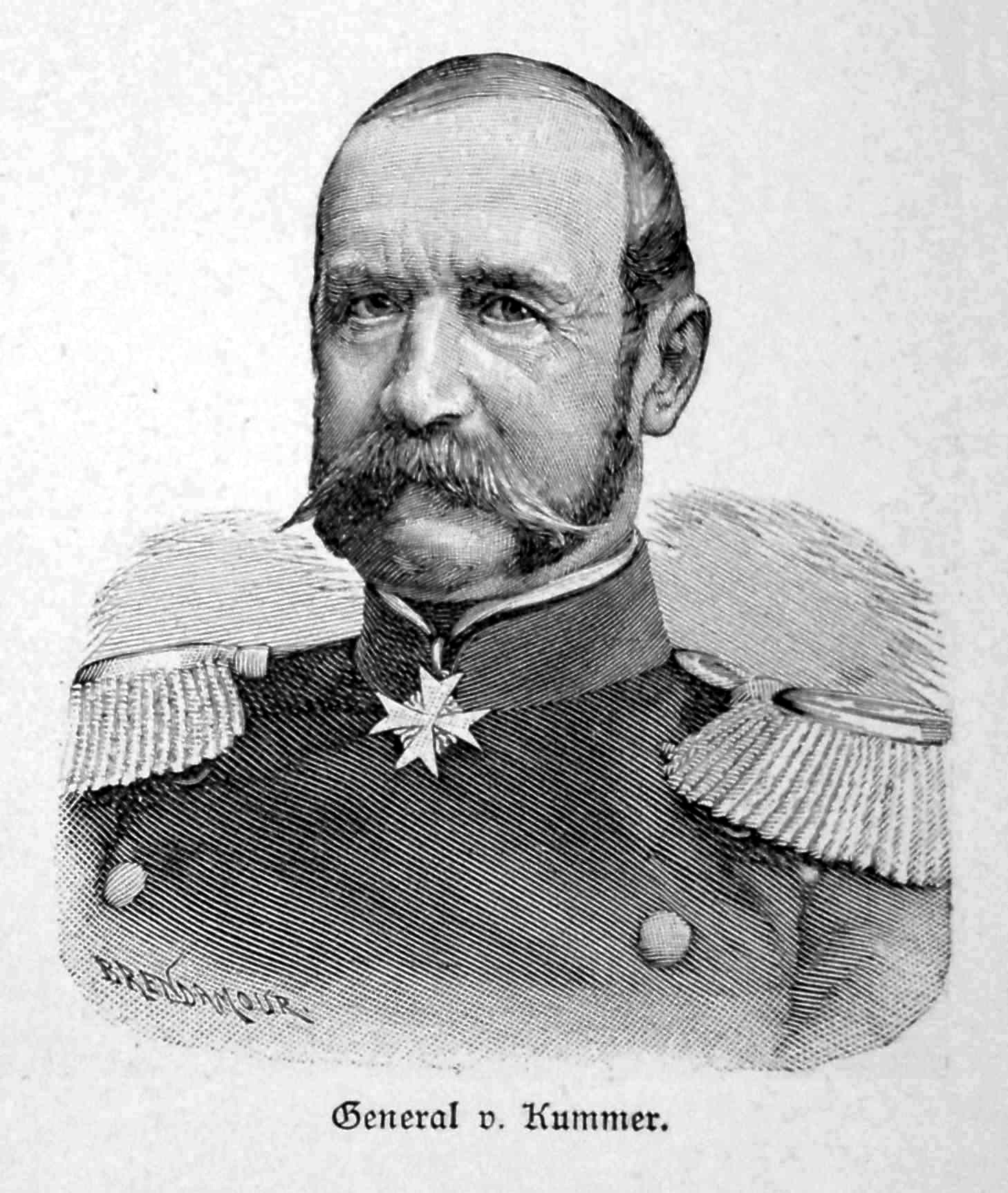
- Born: April 11, 1816; Szelejewo, Grand Duchy of Posen, Kingdom of Prussia
- Died: May 3, 1900 (aged 84); Hanover, Province of Hanover, German Empire
- Burial place: New St. Nikolai Cemetery, Hanover
- Military career
- Allegiance: Kingdom of Prussia; North German Confederation; German Empire
- Branch: Prussian Army; Imperial German Army
- Rank: General of the Infantry
- Commands: 3rd Reserve Division; 15th Division
- Conflicts: Greater Poland Uprising; Austro-Prussian War: Campaign of the Main; Battle of Kissingen; Battle of Aschaffenburg; Franco-Prussian War: Siege of Metz; Battle of Bellevue; Battle of Amiens; Battle of Bapaume
- Awards: Pour le Merite with oak leaves Order of the Red Eagle (Grand Cross)

Rudolf Ferdinand von Kummer (1816–1900) was a Prussian general who participated in the Austro-Prussian and Franco-Prussian wars.

== Biography ==
=== Early life and family ===
Rudolf Ferdinand was the son of the Prussian chief bailiff Ferdinand Friedrich Kummer (1787–1835) and his wife Eva, born von Kalinowski (1799–1863).

Kummer married Henriette Johannes (1817-1892) on February 26, 1838, in Polskawies, Gnesen district. The following children were born from the marriage:

- Amalie Karoline Johanne (* 1838) ⚭ Walter von Kalckstein (1840–1903), Prussian major general
- Heinrich Ferdinand (1841–1924), Prussian Lieutenant General ⚭ Marie Kahlbaum (1848–1894)

=== Military career ===
Kummer attended grammar school in Bromberg and Posen. He then enlisted in the Prussian Army on January 13, 1834, as a Fusilier in the 18th Infantry Regiment; and was promoted to second lieutenant in mid-September of the next year. In 1848 he took part in several battles against Polish insurgents as a captain and general staff officer. After the fighting he was assigned to the Reorganization Commission in the Province of Posen. After being promoted to major in 1855, he was transferred to the 10th Division as a staff officer. Later he was transferred to the Guard Corps. In 1860, when he was promoted to lieutenant colonel, he was appointed Chief of Staff of the I Corps, based in Königsberg. Soon after, he was reassigned to the same position back in the Guard Corps. It was here that he was promoted to colonel in 1861. From 1864 to 1865 Kummer commanded the 37th (West Prussian) Fusilier Regiment, which was stationed in Rawicz. His next command was over the 25th Infantry Brigade in Münster, which he commanded as major general from 1865. With his unit he served in the Austro-Prussian War, participating in the Campaign of the Main. After the end of the war, on September 20, 1866, Kummer received the prestigious Pour le Mérite for his achievements.

In 1868 he became inspector of the Mainz garrison with the rank of lieutenant general. After the beginning of the Franco-Prussian War, Kummer was given command of the 3rd Reserve Division on August 10, 1870. This division was composed of the subordinate 3rd Landwehr Division, an infantry brigade, a reserve cavalry brigade and some artillery and pioneers. With said unit he participated in the Siege of Metz until the surrender. His division fought in the Battle of Noisseville and carried the brunt of the Battle of Bellevue. After the fall of Metz on October 27, 1870, he was in command of Metz until November 6. Meanwhile the Landwehr and infantry units were tasked with escorting the numerous prisoners of war and the division was broken up. Then Kummer took over command of the 15th Division, part of the VIII Corps and the First Army in northern France. There he fought successfully in the Battle of Amiens and the Battle of the Hallue and led the advance on Bapaume, which led to the Battle of Bapaume. After the victory at Saint-Quentin on January 19, 1871, the fighting was over for him. He also received the oak leaves of the Pour le Mérite on January 12, 1871.

After peace was made with the Treaty of Frankfurt Kummer went to Cologne, where he also served as governor from October 1873 to January 1875. Afterwards Kummer was promoted to General of the Infantry and semi-retired. In addition to his salary, he received an annual bonus of 6,000 marks. On January 9, 1877, Kummer was retired while simultaneously being awarded the Grand Cross of the Order of the Red Eagle with Oak Leaves and Swords.

He died in Hanover in 1900 and was buried there in the New St. Nikolai Cemetery.

== Bibliography ==
- Kummer, Rudolf Ferdinand von. In: Brockhaus Konversations-Lexikon 1894–1896, 10. Band, S. 798.
- Kummer - eLexikon
- Edmund Ollier, Cassell's history of the war between France and Germany, 1870-1871, 1871.
- Graf Wartensleben, Hermann (1872). Feldzug, 1870-71: Die Operationen der I. Armee unter General von Manteuffel (in German). E.S. Mittler & Sohn.
- Georg Karl Friedrich Viktor von Alten, Handbuch für Heer und Flotte: Enzyklopädie der Kriegswissenschaften und verwandter Gebiete, Volume 5, Deutsches Verlagshaus Bong, 1913.
- Hermann Adolph Fechner, Der deutsch-französische Krieg 1870/71, G. Grote, 1890.
