= Erwin von Neipperg =

Austrian General of the Cavalry (1813-1897)

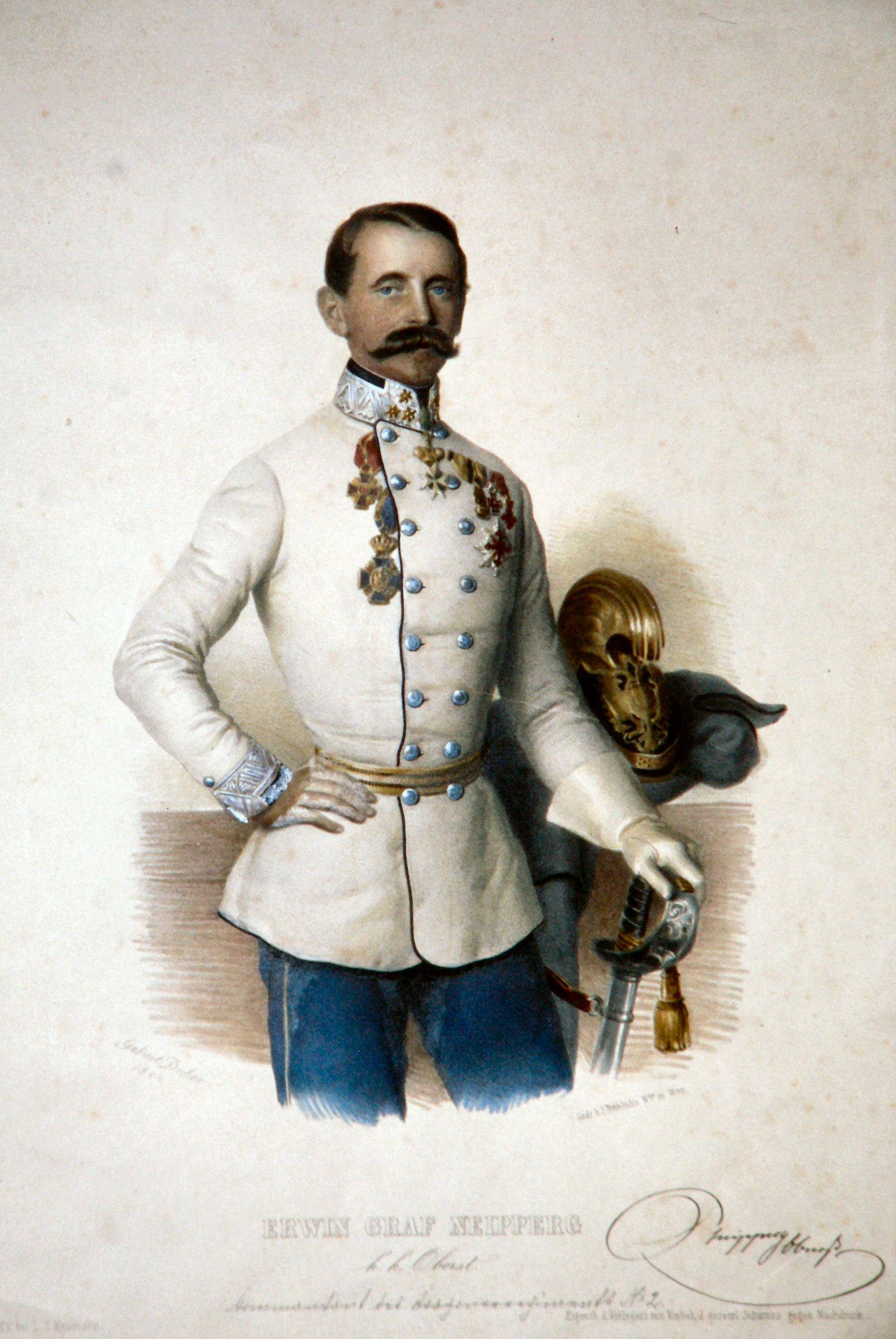
- Born: 6 April 1813; Schwaigern, Heilbronn, Württemberg
- Died: 2 March 1897 (aged 83); Schwaigern, Heilbronn, Württemberg, German Empire
- Military career
- Allegiance: Austrian Empire; Württemberg; Austria-Hungary
- Branch: Austria Army; Royal Württemberg Army; Austro-Hungarian Army
- Service years: 1833 – 1876
- Rank: General of the Cavalry
- Commands: 4th Division, VIII Army Corps
- Conflicts: First Italian War of Independence; Battle of Custoza; Austro-Prussian War; Battle of Aschaffenburg

Count Erwin Franz Ludwig Bernhard Ernst von Neipperg (6 April 1813 – 2 March 1897) was an Austrian General of the Cavalry of Württembergian descent who was notable for being the main commander at the Battle of Aschaffenburg.

== Early life ==
Neipperg was born on 6 April 1813 in Schwaigern, in the Kingdom of Württemberg. He was the youngest son of General Count Adam Albert von Neipperg (a grandson of Count Wilhelm Reinhard von Neipperg) and his first wife, Countess Theresia Pola di Treviso (1778–1815). His elder brother, Count Alfred von Neipperg, married Princess Marie Friederike Charlotte of Württemberg (a daughter of King William I of Württemberg and Grand Duchess Catherine Pavlovna of Russia, the fourth daughter of Tsar Paul I of Russia). After his mother's death, Adam Albert would marry Archduchess Maria Luisa of Habsburg-Lorraine, Napoleon's widow and daughter of Emperor Franz II, thus acquiring the title of Count of Neipperg.

== Career ==
Neipperg completed military studies and after the death of his father acquired, in coregency with his brothers Alfred, Ferdinand and Gustav, lead the village of Schwaigern with its annexation of Burg Neipperg, the hunting grounds in Kleingartach, Bönningheim and Erlingheim as well as lands in Schwaigern and a forest near Neipperg. In 1833, he and his brothers closed a trust on the succession, which gave all the property to the eldest son and regulated the succession in the event of the termination of a line of descendants.

Neipperg served for a long time in the Imperial Austrian Army as a cavalry officer in the garrison in Parma, where his stepmother Maria Luisa resided. He was promoted to colonel in 1848 and was commander of the Austrian garrison in Parma. He found himself to stem the weak insurrectional uprisings that took place in Parma and to support the heir to the throne, Carlo III of Parma. He participated in the battles of the First Italian War of Independence, distinguishing himself in Morozzo and Custoza. Subsequently, he was military governor of Gorizia until 1865; having been promoted to Feldmarschall-Leutnant in 1863.

Fiercely anti-Prussian and a supporter of a federation of German states led by the Austrian Empire, Neipperg participated in the Austro-Prussian War at the head of the 4th Division of the VIII Army Corps, composed of Austrian and Nassauian troops. On 14 July 1866, due to the pleas of Prince Alexander of Hesse and by Rhine for Austrian support in the Campaign of the Main, he clashed with the troops of the Prussian general August Karl von Goeben near Aschaffenburg. The Prussians, in clear numerical superiority with 16,600 men, won a crushing victory over Neipperg's troops that forced the Austrians, now decimated, to a hasty flight. Neipperg, after having been military commander of Bratislava and Vienna, left the Imperial Austrian Army and for some years served as head of the local militia of the Kingdom of Württemberg, leaving all military posts in 1878. Meanwhile he had been promoted to General of the Cavalry in 1870.

== Personal life ==
Neipperg's first marriage was with the Countess Henriette von Waldstein-Wartenberg (1823–1845), who however died after a few months of marriage, and his second marriage was with Princess Rosa von Lobkowitz (1832–1905) at Gorizia. Rosa was a sister of Prince Georg Christian von Lobkowitz and a descendant of one of the oldest and most noble families of the Bohemian aristocracy. His wedding witness was Count Georg Otto von Toggenburg-Sargans, Governor of Veneto. Together, they had three children:

- Count Reinhard (1856–1919), who married Countess Gabriele Ida von Waldstein-Wartenberg (1857–1948).
- Countess Anna Berta (1857–1932), who married Prince Ferdinand Zdenko von Lobkowitz (1858–1938).
- Countess Maria Hedwig (1859–1916), who married Count Franz Xavier von Königsegg-Aulendorf (1858–1927).

Count von Neipperg died on 2 March 1897 in Schwaigern.

=== Honors and awards ===
In 1873 he had been awarded by Franz Joseph of Austria, the knighthood of the Order of the Golden Fleece. He also received the Order of the Gold Lion of the House of Nassau from Adolphe, Grand Duke of Luxembourg.

== Ancestry ==
Ancestors of Erwin von Neipperg

16. Eberhard Friedrich, Baron of Neipperg
8. Wilhelm Reinhard, Count of Neipperg
17. Margareta Lucretia von Hornberg
4. Leopold Joseph, Count of Neipperg
18. Count Franz Ferdinand von Khevenhüller-Frankenburg
9. Countess Maria Franziska Theresia von Khevenhüller-Frankenburg
19. Baroness Maria Theresia von Lubetich-Chapelot
2. Adam Albert, Count of Neipperg
20. Baron Wilhelm Franz von Hatzfeld
10. Count Karl Ferdinand von Hatzfeldt-Wildenburg
21. Baroness Sophie Therese von Loë
5. Countess Marie Wilhelmine von Hatzfeldt-Wildenburg
22. Baron Lothar Karl von Bettendorff
11. Baroness Marie Sophie von Bettendorff
23. Countess Marie Sophie von Stadion
1. Erwin, Count of Neipperg
24. Count Antonio IV Pola di Treviso
12. Count Orazio Paolo Pola di Treviso
25. Marchioness Aurelia Ippoliti di Gazoldo
6. Count Antonio V Pola di Treviso
26. Count Rudolf di Colloredo
13. Countess Felicita di Colloredo
27. Countess Delia Maria Silvestri di Congoli
3. Countess Theresia Pola di Treviso
28. Count Raimondo Bonifacio von Thurn-Valsassina-Hofer
14. Count Johann Baptist von Thurn-Valsassina-Hofer
29. Paolina Clara dei Signori di Caporiacco
7. Countess Maria Antonia Floriana von Thurn-Valsassina
30. Count Johann Josef von Strassoldo
15. Countess Maria Cecilia von Strassoldo
31. Maria Cäcilia Anna von Gera
