= Karl von Wrangel =

Prussian general (1812–1899)

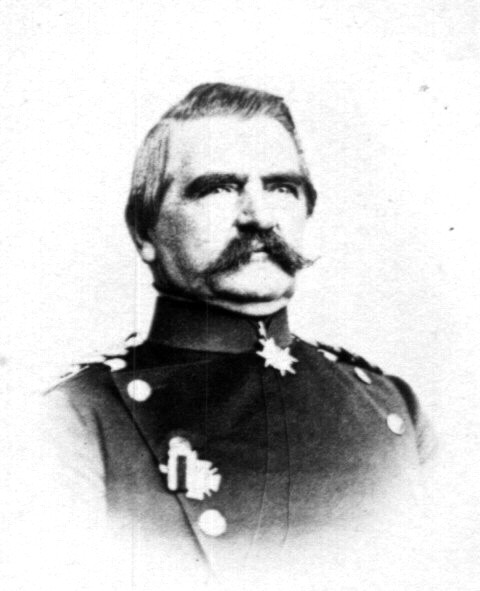
- Born: 28 September 1812; Königsberg, East Prussia, Prussia
- Died: 28 November 1899 (aged 87); Quitzdorf am See, Görlitz, Saxony, Germany
- Spouse: Elisabeth Adelheid Ernestine von Strantz (m. 1843–1891)
- Military career
- Allegiance: Prussia; North German Confederation; German Empire
- Branch: Prussian Army; Imperial German Army
- Service years: 1830–1841; 1843–1876
- Rank: General of the Infantry
- Nickname: Drummer of Kolding
- Commands: 18th Division
- Conflicts: First Schleswig War: Battle of Kolding; Austro-Prussian War: Battle of Frohnhofen; Franco-Prussian War
- Awards: Pour le Merite with oak leaves Order of the Red Eagle (Grand Cross)

Friedrich Wilhelm Karl Oskar Freiherr von Wrangel (1812–1899) was a Prussian General of the Infantry who was notable for commanding at the Battle of Kolding during the First Schleswig War.

== Biography ==
=== Origin ===
Born into the noble Wrangel family, he was the son of the later Prussian Lieutenant General August Friedrich Ludwig Freiherr von Wrangel and his wife, Karoline Sophie Henriette, née Countess von Waldburg zu Alt- und Neu-Bestendorf (1777–1819).

=== Military career ===
Wrangel was educated in the Culm and Berlin cadet houses and entered military service on 13 August 1830, as a second lieutenant in the 1st Foot Guards. He attended the Prussian Staff College in Berlin from 1837 to 1840.

In December 1841, Wrangel had to leave the service because of duelling and after he had healed from the serious wound he received, he was reinstated in March 1843 by the future Kaiser Wilhelm I. In the next year he was assigned to the Trigonometric Department of the General Staff in Berlin. Having become premier lieutenant in 1846, he accompanied his uncle, Lieutenant General Friedrich Graf von Wrangel, when the latter had received the supreme command of the German troops intended for the First Schleswig War. Accordingly he went to the Elbe duchies in April 1848. There he became a captain and was transferred to the General Staff of Schleswig-Holstein, participating in the campaigns of 1848 and 49.

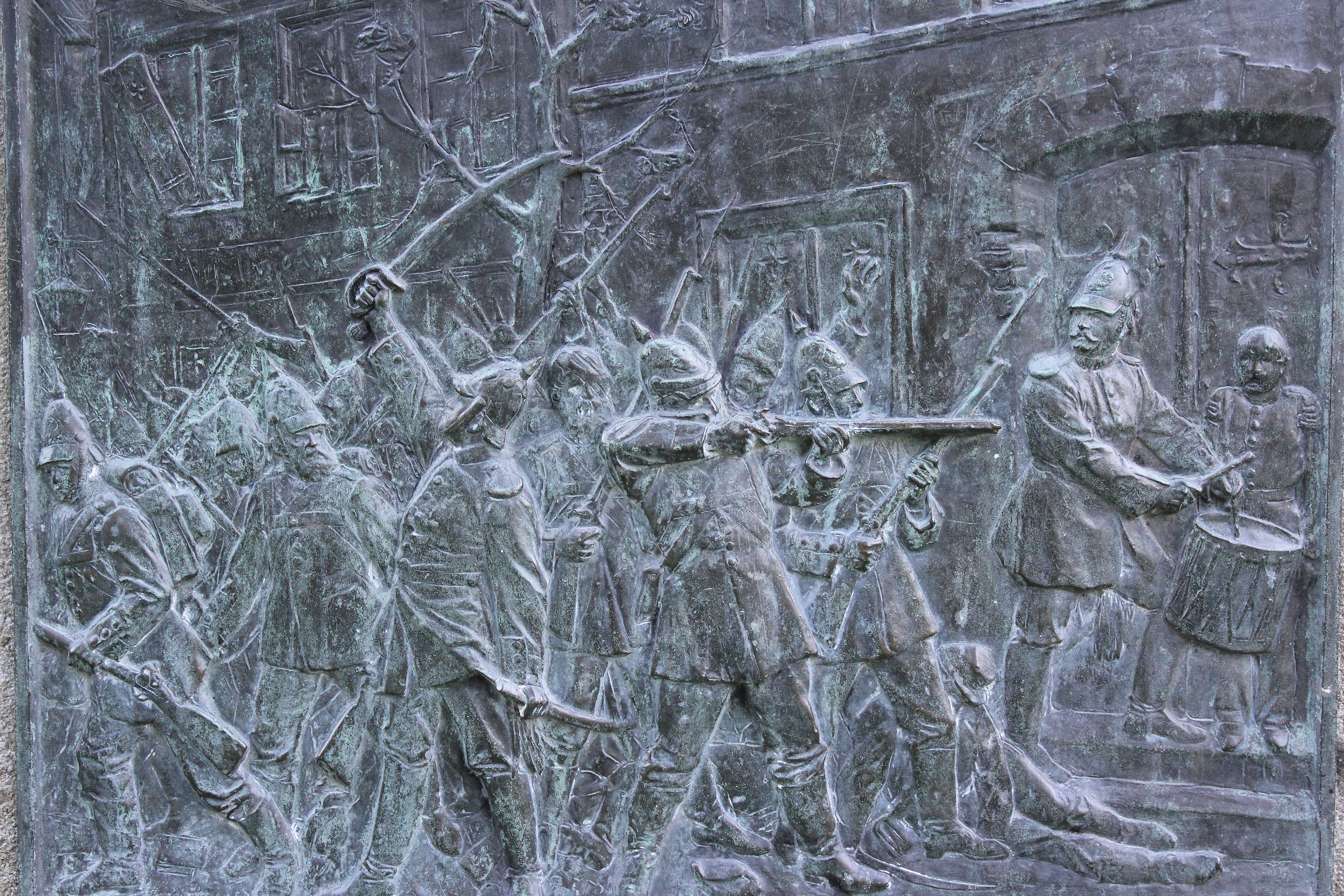
The drummer of Kolding in the Prussian Relief depicted the monument in Flensburg.

Before that he had acquired the nickname of "Drummer of Kolding", which a newspaper gave him. The incident that gave him the name took place on 29 April 1849, during the Battle of Kolding, which was occupied by the Schleswig-Holsteiners. When they gave way to the advancing Danes, Wrangel brought them to a halt by snatching the drum from a drummer and began playing the double-quick pace.

When Prussia recalled its officers in April 1850, Wrangel became head of the Topographical Department and only returned to frontline service as a lieutenant colonel during the mobilization of 1859. He was now at the head of a Landwehr regiment, which soon became the 61st (8th Pomeranian) Infantry Regiment in Stolp.

In the Austro-Prussian War, he became commander of the 26th Infantry Brigade in Münster and took part in the Campaign of the Main. He fought in the battles at Dermbach, Kissingen, Laufach, Aschaffenburg, Tauberbischofsheim and the Battle of Gerchsheim. For his services at Gerchsheim, he was awarded the Pour le Mérite.

On 10 August 1867, he was appointed commander of the 18th Division in Flensburg and promoted to lieutenant general in the spring of 1868. In the Franco-Prussian War, his division was part of the IX Corps and participated in the battles of Colombey-Nouilly, Mars-la-Tour and Gravelotte. During the Siege of Metz, his troops attacked from 1 September during the Battle of Noiseville in support of the defensive battle of the Prussian I Corps stationed on the east bank of the Moselle. His division distinguished itself particularly in the Second Battle of Orléans in early December. From there Prince Friedrich Karl of Prussia, Commander-in-Chief of the First and Second armies, telegraphed to Versailles:

The honor of the day belongs to the Wrangel Division.

For this Wrangel was awarded the oak leaves to his Pour le Mérite. As the war progressed, Wrangel's division was involved in the Battle of Le Mans on 11 January 1871.

After peace was concluded, Wrangel remained at the head of his division in Flensburg until June 1872, when he became governor of Posen. On 2 September 1873 he was given the character of a General of Infantry. Wrangel would retire on 12 December 1876. In recognition of his many years of service, Wilhelm I awarded him the Grand Cross of the Order of the Red Eagle with Oak Leaves and Swords on 16 September 1881. He also was a knight of the Johanniter Order.

=== Family ===
Wrangel had married Elisabeth Adelheid Ernestine von Strantz (25 September 1813 in Berlin – 27 February 1891 in Sproitz ) on 26 March 1843. From the marriage came the daughter Adda (born 28 July 1844 in Charlottenburg; died 23 January 1913), who married Karl Freiherr von Liliencron († 1901), Herr auf Sproitz, a chamberlain and former Rittmeister, on 29 July 1864 in Berlin. Adda was a prolific writer and a founding member and chairwoman of the Women's League of the German Colonial Society.

=== Legacy ===
In 1903, a memorial was unveiled in Flensburg's city park in his memory, consisting of a statue with a pedestal to which a relief depicting Kolding's drummer was attached. In addition, a street in Flensburg is named after him and there is also a street in Kiel named after him.

== Honours and awards ==
- Honorary Citizen of Flensburg, 1872

=== Orders and decorations ===
- Kingdom of Prussia:
  - Knight of the Order of the Red Eagle, 4th Class with Swords, 1853; 2nd Class with Star and Oak Leaves, 1871; 1st Class with Swords on Ring, 22 March 1873; Grand Cross, 16 September 1881
  - Service Award Cross
  - Knight of Honour of the Johanniter Order, 1865; Knight of Justice, 1874
  - Pour le Mérite (military), 20 September 1866; with Oak Leaves, 5 December 1870
  - Iron Cross (1870), 1st Class with 2nd Class on Black Band
- (Saxe-Coburg and Gotha) (Duchy of Saxe-Altenburg) (Saxe-Meiningen) Ernestine duchies: Commander of the Saxe-Ernestine House Order, 2nd Class, February 1859
- Grand Duchy of Hesse: Military Merit Cross, 30 January 1871
- Mecklenburg-Schwerin: Military Merit Cross, 2nd Class
- Russian Empire:
  - Knight of the Imperial Order of Saint Vladimir, 4th Class
  - Knight of the Imperial Order of Saint Anna, 2nd Class with Crown
- Saxe-Weimar-Eisenach: Commander of the Order of the White Falcon, 24 March 1859
- Sweden-Norway: Commander of the Royal Order of the Sword, 1st Class, 21 December 1859

== See also ==
- List of the Pour le Mérite (military class) recipients
