= Battle of Buchy =

- Part of Franco-Prussian War
Date	4 December 1870
Location	Buchy, Seine-Maritime, France
Result	German victory

Belligerents
French Republic	North German Confederation: Prussia

Commanders and leaders
Guillaume Briand	August Karl von Goeben

Units involved
Garde Mobile	VIII Corps

Strength
12,000 – 13,000 troops of the Garde Mobile, 12,000 military reconnaissance Eclaireurs, 1 marine corps	25,000 – 30,000 infantry
- 25 – 30 artillery

Casualties and losses
"Heavy casualties", 400 people captured	Unknown

The Battle of Buchy was fought during the Franco-Prussian War, on 4 December 1870, at Buchy, Seine-Maritime, France. During the battle, the VIII Corps of the Prussian Army, under the command of General of the Infantry August Karl von Goeben, suddenly attacked and defeated a French force under the command of General de Brigade Guillaume Briand. The French suffered heavy losses. After their victory at Buchy, German troops captured Rouen.

== Background ==
After capturing Amiens at the end of November 1870, the commander of the Prussian First Army, Edwin von Manteuffel, continued to march towards Rouen, a city located on the Seine in Normandy. Aiming to attack a French division under the command of General Briand, the First Army marched with VIII Corps on the right flank, through Poix and Forges, and I Corps, on the left, through Breteuil. The French had deployed before Rouen to defend the city, but had not yet finished building up their defenses.

On 2 December, French cavalry sent to scout the Germans discovered the enemy at Forges-les-Eaux and Formiere. Examining the situation, German forces departed for Grandvillers and Gaillefontaine on 3 December. Early in the morning of 4 December, the German VIII Corps descended on Formiere and discovered that the French had abandoned it. Afterward, von Goeben's forces fiercely attacked the French army stationed on the heights of Maquency and Bosc-Bordel, on the way to Rouen. The French were eventually dislodged from their defensive position by the German 15th Infantry Division and had to retreat to the village of Buchy.

== Battle ==
At Buchy, the French turned and attempted to repel the Germans long enough to board their troops onto the railway carriages that were waiting for them. The French resisted weakly, despite their solid defensive position. During the battle, although the scouts of the French Guards fought fiercely, the French Garde Mobiles and franc-tireurs were wiped out by German artillery. The battle ended with the defeat of the French, forcing them to abandon the ambulance from Switzerland, along with their portable equipment.

== Aftermath ==
Eventually, the situation of the French National Guard assembled at Rouen became dire, and the French abandoned Rouen when the Germans advanced. On 6 December, Rouen was occupied by a large German garrison. The 5th of December is the anniversary of the victory of Frederick the Great over the Austrians at the Battle of Leuthen, and of von Goeben's victory when he entered Rouen without expending a single bullet.
