= Battle of Frohnhofen =

- Part of Austro-Prussian War
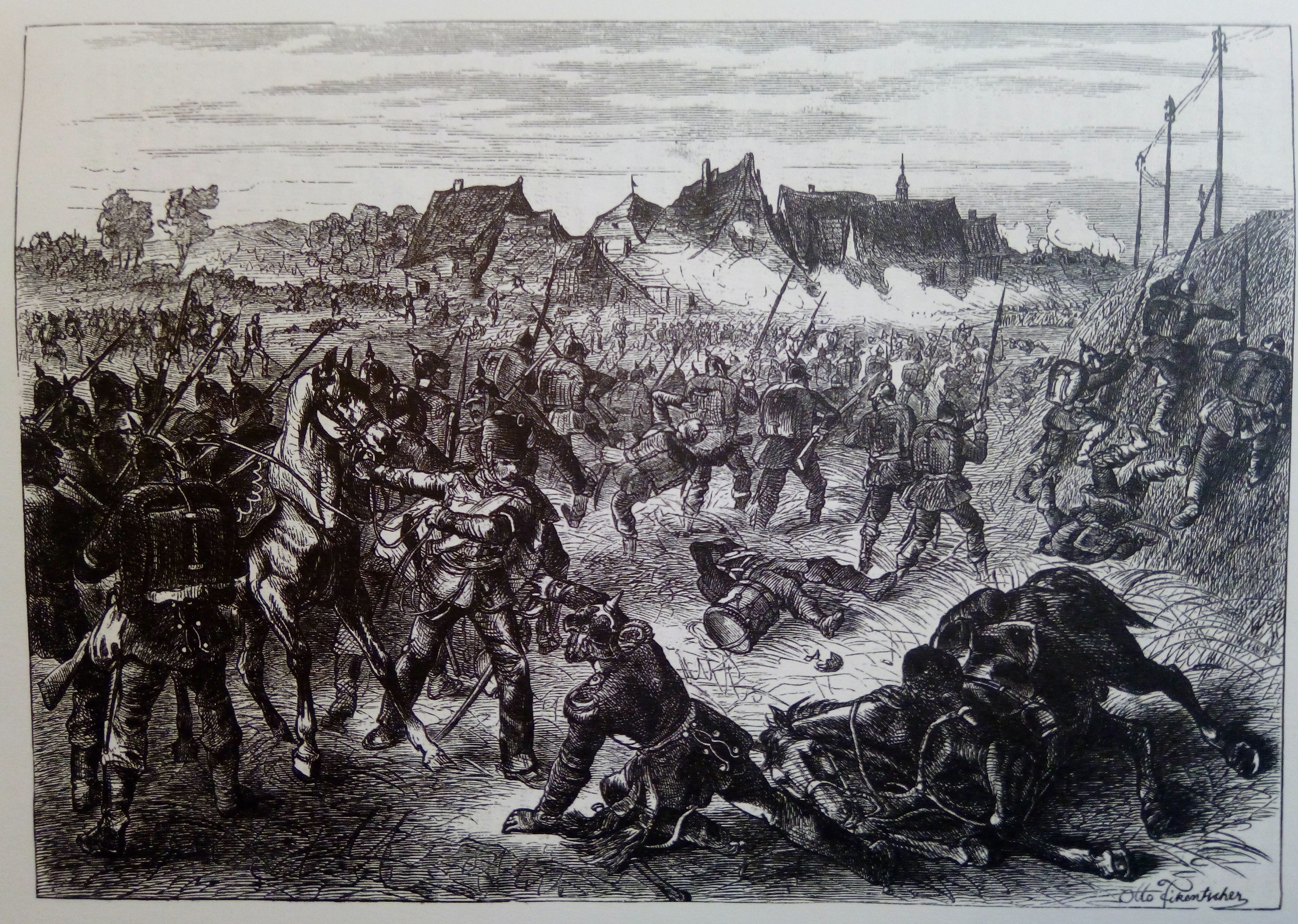
Date	13 July 1866
Location	Frohnhofen, Bavaria
Result	Prussian Victory

Belligerents
Prussia	Hesse

Commanders and leaders
Karl von Wrangel; Eduard Vogel von Falckenstein; Edwin Freiherr von Manteuffel; Ferdinand von Kummer	Philipp Georg Frey; August von Stockhausen †

Units involved
VIII Corps	3rd Division

Strength
7 battalions, 2 squadrons, 2 batteries	8 battalions, 1 squadron, 1 battery

Casualties and losses
5 dead, 60 wounded	175 dead, 394 wounded, 115 captured

The Battle of Frohnhofen or Battle of Laufach took place on 13 July 1866 as part of the Main Campaign of the Prussian Army in the Austro-Prussian War. In a battle lasting several hours, the Prussian 26th Infantry Brigade repulsed attacks by the 3rd (Hessian) Division of the VIII. Corps of the North German Confederation, with the Hessians suffering heavy losses. It thus secured the Spessart crossings and created favorable conditions for the Battle of Aschaffenburg around the Main crossing the next day.

== Background ==
In the context of the fighting in the Austro-Prussian War, Central Germany was a secondary theater of war. From the beginning, the Prussian army concentrated its main forces against the Austrian army in Bohemia and Moravia . On the other hand, only a 50,000-strong army under General von Falckenstein was deployed against the West and South German allies of Austria, which essentially consisted of four divisions. The federal armed forces opposing this association should theoretically have consisted of 120,000 soldiers in four corps. By slowly mobilizing themand positioned far apart, the offensively operating Prussian troops succeeded in preventing the assembly of federal troops north of the low mountain range. Only the VII Federal Corps provided by the Bavarian Army and the VIII Federal Corps from Baden, Hessian, Nassau, Austrian and Württemberg troops were set up. On paper the corps were 46,000 and 40,000 strong, respectively.

On 1 July the Prussian army, still around 43,000 strong, under Falckenstein began its operation against these two troops. They had marched north from Schweinfurt or Frankfurt am Main in order to unite there for joint operations with the Hanoverian troops . After the battle near Dermbach, the Bavarians withdrew and were pushed to the southeast in battles near Hammelburg and Kissingen on 10 July. Falckenstein directed his troops to the west against the VIII. Corps, since the war decision was meanwhile at Königgrätz had fallen and now in Berlin the occupation of the small German states was regarded as more advantageous in view of the coming peace negotiations than a battle against the Bavarian corps; especially since this, as an advance by Manteuffel's corps showed, had withdrawn into a strong position around Schweinfurt.

The VIII. Corps had marched back to Frankfurt after the Bavarian defeat at Dermbach von Fulda, where they wanted to meet the VII. (Bavarian) Corps, and now moved further south to establish a connection with the VII. (Bavarian) Corps. On 12 July the approximately 9,000-strong 3rd (Hessian) Division was sent by rail to Aschaffenburg to secure the crossings over the Main, followed by an Austrian brigade and artillery laterforwarded. The Hessian troops had previously lacked combat experience. She received orders not to engage in serious combat until reinforcements were ready. On 13 July the Hessian division therefore only ordered a brigade under General Frey to clear up the Spessart crossings at Hain and Waldaschaff.

From Lohr, the Prussian 13th Division marched towards her in two separate brigade columns via Waldaschaff and Laufach. The 13th Division under Lieutenant General von Goeben was at that time with the assigned reinforcements about 15,000 men strong, its two brigades were each about 6,000 men strong. He had already been at the center of the fighting in Dermbach and suffered heavy losses at Kissingen. suffered. Since then she had covered more than 50 km to Lohr in the humid heat in two days of marching. On 13 July she set out at 4 a.m. and had to cover another 25 km through mountainous terrain. As with the Hessian troops, the efforts of the march claimed not only a large number of people suffering from the march, but also a few deaths from heat stroke .

== Battle ==
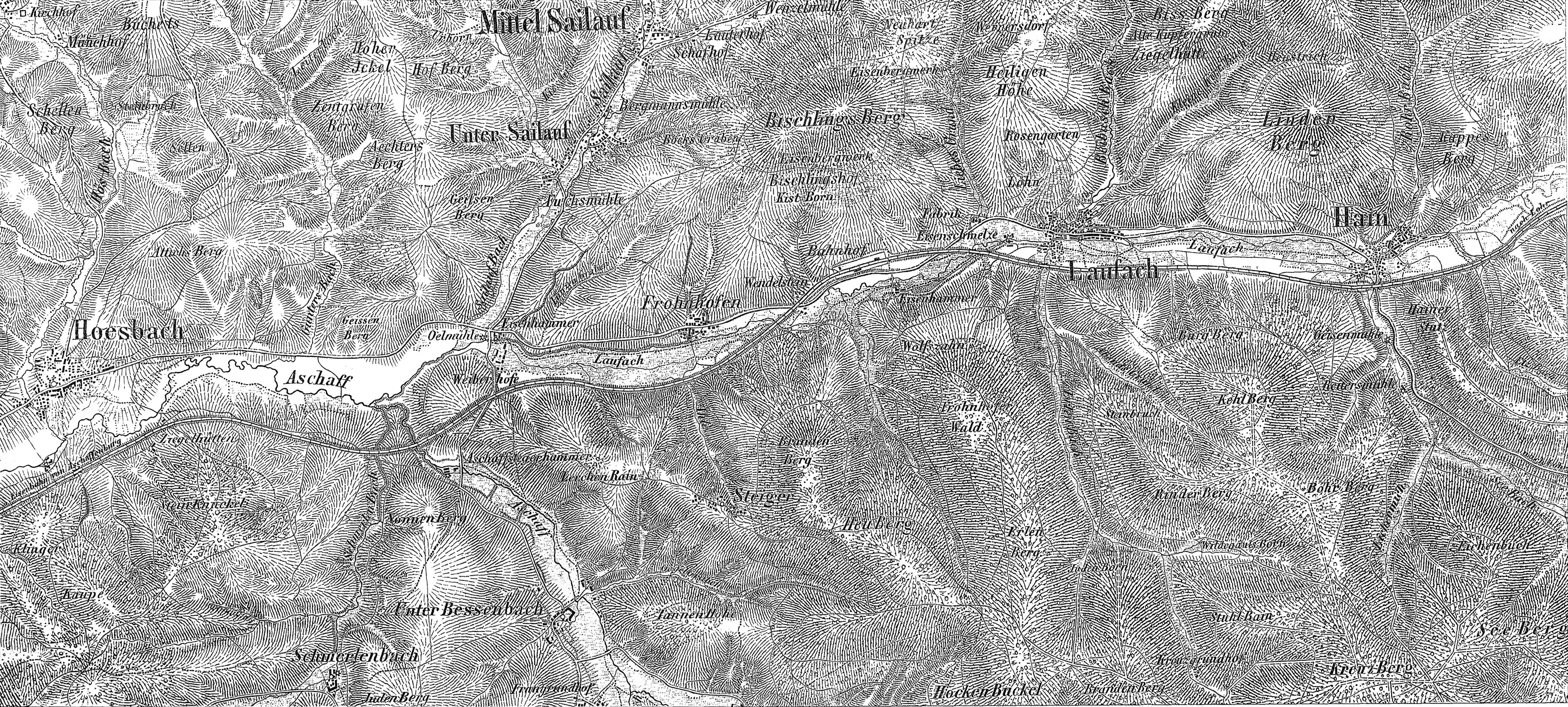
The Geography of Frohnhofen

The Hessian Major General Frey, after his brigade had arrived in Weiberhof at about 12 o'clock, sent 1 battalion each with cavalry up the valleys of the Aschaff and Laufach. He had also reinforced the reconnaissance battalion on the Laufach to Hain with two guns. Cavalry and skirmishers from both groups encountered the heads of the two marching Prussian brigades at around 2:30 a.m. After a brief cavalry battle with the Prussian hussarsAt the head of the marching column under the eyes of General von Goeben, the detachment deployed in the Laufach valley was pushed back on Laufach by the Prussian fusilier battalion marching at the head of the infantry . There the infantry battalion that had taken up position delivered a short firefight and withdrew under steady but ineffective fire, partly covered by the two guns, also around 4:30 a.m., while the Prussian top battalion followed them to Frohnhofen. At about 5 a.m. the two Hessian reconnaissance departments were back in Weiberhof, where they moved outpost lines towards Fronhofen and - along the railway embankment - towards Schmerlenbach, Unterbessenbach and Steigeradvanced 25th Brigade under General von Kummer.

The two infantry brigades of the 13th Division then went to rest. While the 25th Brigade under Major General Kummer was actually no longer involved in combat operations, the 26th Brigade under Wrangel was exposed to repeated attacks from the Hesse region. The reason for this was false information about the condition of the Prussian troops, which caused the Hessian division commander Lieutenant General von Perglas to give his troops orders to attack. The Frey Brigade with 2 regiments of 2 battalions each, one squadron, stood on the Hessian sideCavalry and 6 guns, as well as the Stockhausen brigade with 2 regiments of the Prussian Wrangels Brigade each with 2 battalions, consisting of 2 regiments of 3 battalions, a fusilier battalion, 2 squadrons of hussars and 12 guns, opposite. At the beginning of the fighting, Frey's brigade stood at Weiberhof, Stockhausen's brigade was only just approaching. The Hessian generals only expected weak enemy forces and proceeded accordingly. Wrangel's brigade was in the field camp near Laufach and originally only pushed the Fusilier Battalion 55 to an outpost position on the western outskirts of Frohnhofen, where it secured the 500 m wide valley and the flat northern slopes.

The battle was initiated by Frey's 1st regiment, which had previously been held in reserve around 6:30 a.m. It was advantageous for the Prussians that at the time of the attack the Fusilier Battalion 55, which was on outposts, was replaced by the Fusilier Battalion 15 and a squadron of hussars, thus practically doubling the outpost line from the edge of the forest of the Bischlingsberg to the grove south of Frohnhofen were occupied. The attack carried out by the two battalions of the regiment in the valley on Fronhofen, as well as across the fields northwest of it against the ravine north of Fronhofen, came up against a defense of about the same strength and was repulsed. The firing superiority of the Prussian needle rifles was also made possible by dense lines of fire and the support of the brigade's battery, which was deployed at a height northeast of Weiberhofnot compensate, especially since the Prussian infantry in Fronhofen could hardly be made out and their own infantry soon covered the target for the artillery. The Hessian infantrymen advanced over open, albeit undulating, terrain with tall grain. A second attack by the same troops also failed to penetrate the place. Frey then pulled the defeated regiment, which had lost almost 100 men, out of the battle. The four advanced guns northeast of Weiberhof also soon cleared the field and withdrew to the Geißenberg, as they were threatened by Prussian riflemen who hesitantly followed the Hessians.

There upon the Stockhausen Brigade advanced at full strength along the Chaussee towards Frohnhofen at around 7 o'clock. In the meantime, however, Wrangel had pushed the remaining two battalions of Regiment No. 15, which were encamped on the western edge of Laufach, behind the wings of the outpost position. Again the attack was stopped by the Prussian fire. Several attacks carried out from a deep depression in front of the Prussian front were shot down. The wounded and the dying gathered in the valley. To the north of it, the 4th regiment, which was deployed in the second meeting, succeeded, which swung to the left to achieve a small break-in in Fronhofen near the bowling alley. The attackers who broke in were not only caught in the close range of the defenders in the village, but were also shot at from the north and south by advancing rifle lines and by two batteries driven north and south-west of Wendelstein on the heights. The provided at Wendelstein Prussian Reserve, consisting of the two remaining battalions of the Regiment. 55, then went to the counter-attack and urged the alaq at the bowling alley of the inn Hesse after a short melee of Frohnhofen before the second meeting of the 4th (Hessian) regiment could come up for reinforcement. The two squadrons of cavalry positioned behind the attacking Hessian brigade were not used and went back with the infantry. The Prussian riflemen and a squadron of hussars then carefully chased the Hessian troops to Weiberhof until they were shot at by the two remaining battalions of Freys from Geißenberg and Weiberhof. With their fire they drove away the battery on the Geißenberg and after the Hessian rearguard had withdrawn at about 8 a.m. they captured the baggage that had been left in Weiberhof. The Hessian losses before Frohnhofen were significant. 175 dead and 394 wounded were killed by the Prussian needle guns, while the Prussians, who mainly fought from the covered positions, only suffered 65 dead and wounded. In addition, 124 Hessian soldiers were captured.

== Aftermath ==
The expulsion of the Hessian troops from the narrow area near Weiberhof created favorable conditions for the unification of the Prussian marching columns, and the battle that lasted until late in the evening had caused heavy losses for the Hessian division. The Hessian regiments withdrew to Aschaffenburg, where no provisions had been made for their accommodation. So the next day, when they tried in vain with an Austrian brigade in the Battle of Aschaffenburg, the 13th Division crossed the Mainto refuse, still under the impression of the previous day's defeat in the battle. With the crossing of the Main, the operations of the Prussian troops against the VIII Federal Corps were no longer obstructed by any major terrain. The way to Frankfurt and Darmstadt was free for the Prussians . The Hessian Grand Duke Ludwig and his government fled to Worms and / or Munich. Frohnhofen itself resembled a hospital for days. A group of doctors and nurses from the Hessian field hospital, who later took care of the wounded, found them only poorly cared for in unfavorable hygienic circumstances. The care of the partly seriously wounded had been entrusted to the local population. It was not possible to transport the fallen Hessian soldiers away due to the summer temperatures and the associated rapid decomposition process of the corpses, which is why mass graves were dug right next to the bowling alley. After the end of the war, memorial stones for the fallen were erected here by the Grand Duchy of Hesse.

=== Personnel changes in the Hessian military ===
An investigation was initiated against a number of Hessian officers in connection with their behavior in the Frohnhofen field. The Hessian general von Stockhausen shot himself after the military disaster in which his son was killed. Lieutenant General Carl Freiherr Pergler von Perglas was recalled on August 11 as commander of the Hessian division, although this was officially done for health reasons. However, the general was held responsible for the defeat at Frohnhofen because, contrary to the orders of the corps commander, he had ordered an attack and after this order was given he also left the battlefield. The Hessian War Minister Friedrich von Wachter asked on 6 December 1866 to resign, which then led to his replacement.

== The battlefield today ==
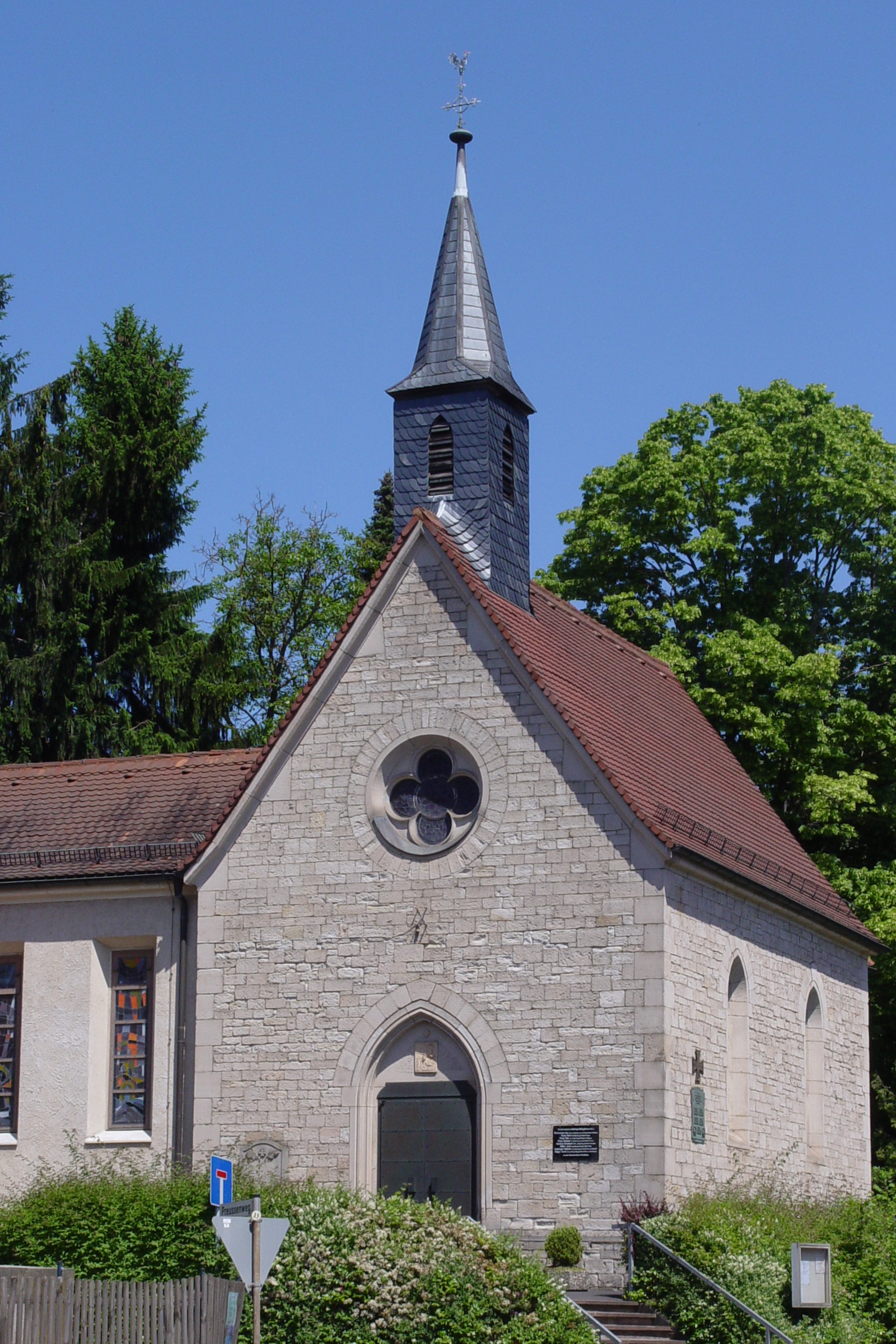
Herz Jesu Kapelle in Frohnhofen

The traces of the fight were visible in Frohnhofen for a long time. Numerous houses in the village had bullet holes in the walls, the old bowling alley was no longer usable after the battle and was exposed to decay. Today, 150 years later, the traces of the struggle can hardly be guessed. Only overgrown remnants of the foundation walls are left of the bowling alley. The old farmsteads were demolished over time and replaced by new buildings. What remains are the grave monuments for the fallen Hessian soldiers, they are now in the cemetery of the village Frohnhofen. For the five fallen Prussians, a memorial plaque was attached to the village's Herz Jesu chapel. The inn of the bowling alley is now the restaurant "Zum alten Brauhaus" with decorative red and white shutters, in which there is a reference to the battle: When you enter the building, you can see three cones worked into the plaster of the wall above the counter with a ball. The scabbard of a saber is attached underneath.
