= Battle of Bapaume =

Battle of Bapaume may refer to:

- Battle of Bapaume (1871), a battle of the Franco-Prussian War
- First Battle of Bapaume March 1918, a battle during the German Spring Offensive of World War I
- Second Battle of Bapaume August 1918, a battle during the Hundred Days' Offensive of World War I
