= August Karl von Goeben =

Prussian general

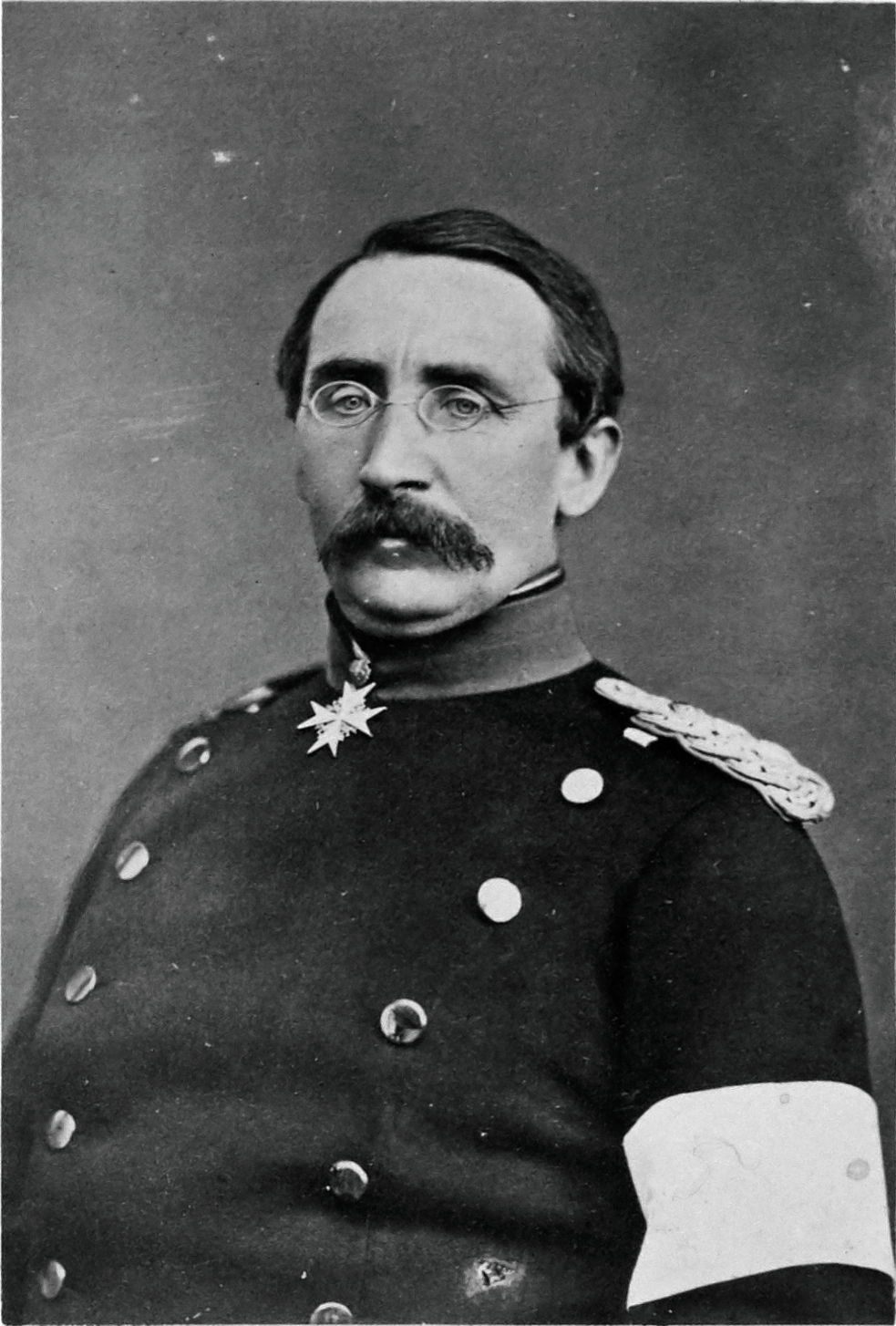
- Born: 10 December 1816; Stade, Kingdom of Hanover
- Died: 12 November 1880 (aged 63); Koblenz, German Empire
- Military career
- Allegiance: Kingdom of Prussia; German Empire
- Branch: Prussian Army; Imperial German Army
- Service years: 1833–1836; 1844–1880
- Rank: General of the Infantry
- Commands: 13th Division; VIII (Rhineland Province) Corps; First Army
- Conflicts: First Carlist War; Second Schleswig War; Austro-Prussian War; Franco-Prussian War; • Battle of St. Quentin (1871)
- Awards: Grand Cross of the Iron Cross

August Karl Friedrich Christian von (Note: In German personal names, von is a preposition which approximately means 'of' or 'from' and usually denotes some sort of nobility. While von (always lower case) is part of the family name or territorial designation, not a first or middle name, if the noble is referred to by their last name, use Schiller, Clausewitz or Goethe, not von Schiller, etc.) Goeben (10 December 1816 – 13 November 1880), was a Prussian infantry general, who won the Iron Cross for his service in the Franco-Prussian War of 1870–71.

== Early career ==
Born at Stade 30 km west of Hamburg in the Kingdom of Hannover, he aspired from his earliest years to the Prussian service rather than that of his own country, and at the age of seventeen, enlisted in the 24th Infantry Regiment, being commissioned as Lieutenant two years later. But there was little scope for the activities of a young and energetic subaltern. Leaving the service in 1836, he enlisted in the Carlist army fighting the First Carlist War in Spain. In the five campaigns in which he served Don Carlos, he had many turns of fortune. He had not fought for two months when he fell, severely wounded, into the hands of the Spanish royalist troops. After eight months' detention, he escaped, but it was not long before he was captured again. This time his imprisonment was long and painful, and on two occasions, he was compelled to draw lots for his life with his fellow captives.

When released, Goeben served until 1840 with distinction. In that year, he made his way back, a man without means, to Prussia. The Carlist lieutenant colonel was glad to be re-admitted into the Prussian Army as a second lieutenant, but he was still young, and few subalterns could claim five years meritorious war service at the age of twenty-four. In a few years, he was a captain on the Great General Staff, and in 1848, he was transferred to the staff of the IV Corps, where his immediate superior was Major Helmuth Graf von Moltke. The two men became fast friends, and their mutual esteem was never disturbed. During the Baden Revolution, Goeben distinguished himself on the staff of Prince William, the future emperor. He alternated staff and regimental duty in the Prussian service for some years after this, until in 1863, he was promoted to major-general commanding the 26th Infantry Brigade.

In 1860 he served as military observer with the Spanish troops during the Spanish-Moroccan War, and was present at the Battle of Tetuan.

== Military commands ==
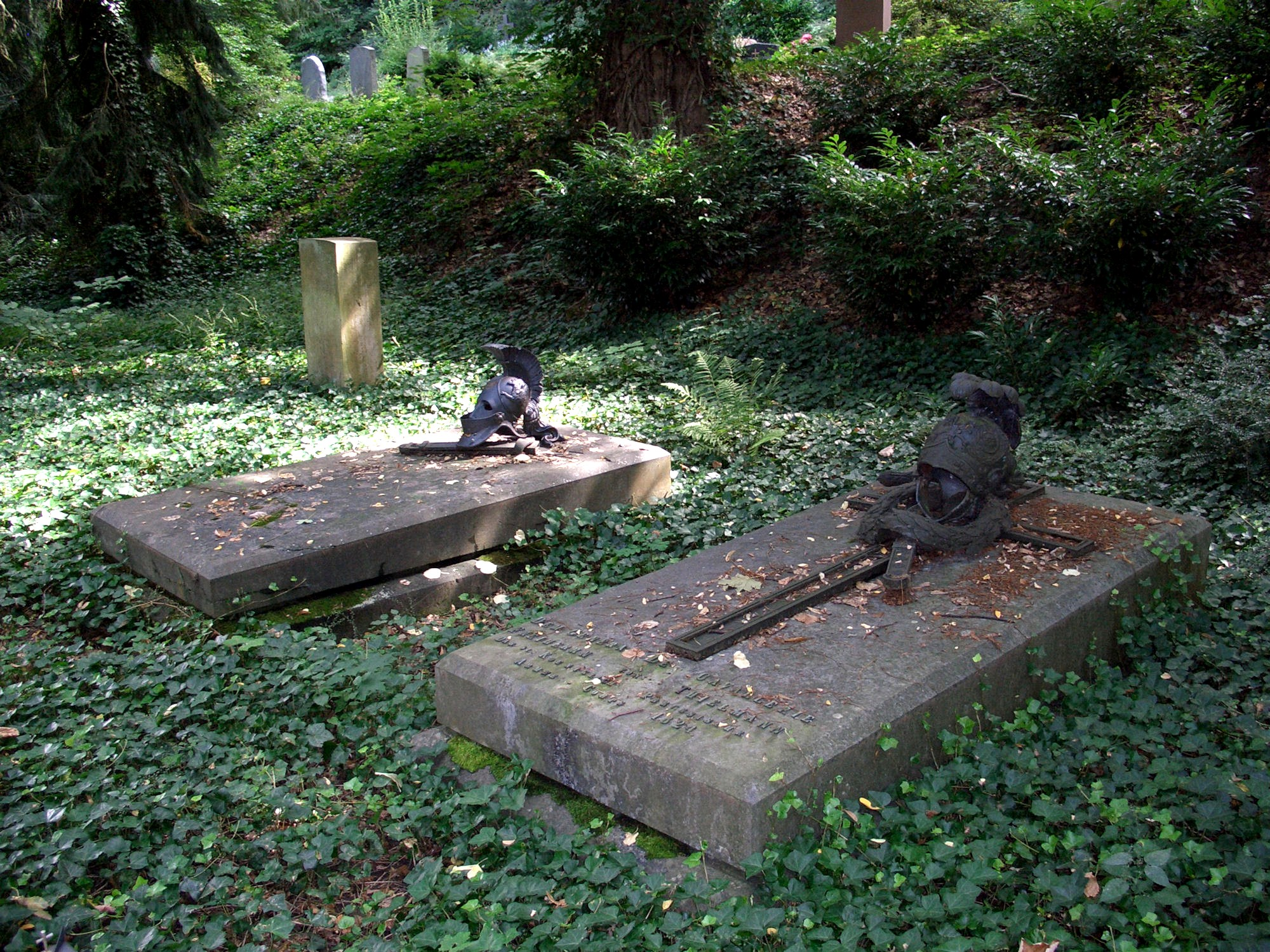
Graves of the Prussian generals at the cemetery of Koblenz, on the left side is the memorial stone for August Karl von Goeben

In 1864, during the Danish-Prussian War, he distinguished himself at the head of his brigade at Rackebüll and Sonderburg. In the 1866 Austro-Prussian War, Lieutenant-General von Goeben commanded the 13th Division, of which his old brigade formed part, and, in this higher sphere, once more displayed the qualities of a born leader and skilful tactician. He held almost independent command with conspicuous success in the actions of Dermbach, Kissingen, Laufach, Aschaffenburg, Gerchsheim, Tauberbischofsheim and Würzburg.

The mobilization of 1870 at the start of the Franco-Prussian War placed him at the head of the VIII (Rhineland Province) Corps, forming part of the First Army under Karl Friedrich von Steinmetz. It was his resolute and energetic leading that contributed mainly to the victory at the Battle of Spicheren on 6 August, and von Goeben won the only laurels gained on the Prussian right wing at Gravelotte on 18 August. Under Edwin Freiherr von Manteuffel, the VIII Corps took part in the operations about Amiens and Bapaume, and on 8 January 1871, Goeben succeeded that general in the command of the First Army.

Two weeks later, he brought the campaign in northern France to its conclusion by the decisive victory at the Battle of St. Quentin (19 January 1871). The close of the Franco-Prussian War left Goeben one of the most distinguished men in the victorious army. He was named colonel-in-chief of the 28th (2nd Rhenish) Infantry Regiment, and was awarded the Grand Cross of the Iron Cross. He commanded the VIII Corps at Koblenz until his death in 1880.

== Writings ==
General von Goeben left many writings. His memoirs are to be found in his works:

- Vier Jahre in Spanien (Four Years in Spain) (Hanover, 1841),
- Reise-und Lagerbriefe aus Spanien und vom spanischen Heere in Marokko (Hanover, 1863) and
- Darmstadt Allgemeine Militärzeitung.

== Legacy ==
The former French fort de Queuleu at Metz was renamed Goeben after him, and the 28th Infantry bears his name. A statue of Goeben by Fritz Schaper was erected at Koblenz in 1884. The SMS Goeben, a Moltke-class battlecruiser of the Kaiserliche Marine (German Navy) launched in 1911, was also named after him.

== Honours and awards ==
- Kingdom of Prussia:
  - Knight of the Red Eagle, 4th Class with Swords, 1849; 2nd Class with Oak Leaves, 1860; Grand Cross with Swords on Ring, 2 September 1873
  - Knight of the Crown Order, 2nd Class with Swords, 10 March 1864
  - Service Award Cross
  - Pour le Mérite (military), 3 July 1864; with Oak Leaves, 20 September 1866
  - Grand Commander's Cross of the Royal House Order of Hohenzollern, with Swords, 6 January 1871
  - Grand Cross of the Iron Cross (1870), 22 March 1871
  - Knight of the Black Eagle, 5 July 1875; with Collar, 1876
- Spain:
  - Knight's Cross of the Military Order of St. Ferdinand, ca. 1840
  - Knight's Cross of the Order of Isabella the Catholic, ca. 1840
  - Cross of Honour
  - Grand Cross of the Order of Charles III, with Collar, 27 January 1878
- Baden:
  - Knight of the Military Karl-Friedrich Merit Order, 1849
  - Grand Cross of the Zähringer Lion, with Swords, 1877
- (Saxe-Coburg and Gotha) (Duchy of Saxe-Altenburg) (Saxe-Meiningen) Ernestine duchies: Commander of the Saxe-Ernestine House Order, 1st Class, November 1857
- Oldenburg: Grand Cross of the Order of the Order of Duke Peter Friedrich Ludwig, with Swords, 29 July 1866
- Mecklenburg-Schwerin: Military Merit Cross, 2nd Class
- Schaumburg-Lippe: Military Merit Medal
- Württemberg: Grand Cross of the Military Merit Order, 20 November 1870
- Russian Empire:
  - Knight of St. George, 4th Class, 27 December 1870; 3rd Class, 5 April 1873
  - Knight of St. Stanislaus, 2nd Class
- Kingdom of Saxony: Commander of the Military Order of Saint Henry, 1st Class, 1871
- (Austrian Empire) (Kingdom of Hungary) Austria-Hungary: Grand Cross of the Imperial Order of Leopold, with War Decoration, 1872

== Portrayal in media ==
In the Danish miniseries 1864, Goeben was portrayed by Czech actor Karel Dobrý.
