= 15th Division (German Empire) =

15th Division (15. Division); in 1870-71 and from August 2, 1914, 15th Infantry Division (15. Infanterie-Division)
- Active: 1818–1919
- Country: Prussia/Germany
- Branch: Army
- Type: Infantry (in peacetime included cavalry)
- Size: Approx. 15,000
- Part of: VIII. Army Corps (VIII. Armeekorps)
- Garrison/HQ: Cologne
- Engagements: Austro-Prussian War: Königgrätz Franco-Prussian War: Gravelotte, Metz, Amiens, Hallue, Bapaume, St. Quentin World War I: Great Retreat, 1st Marne, Somme, German spring offensive, Oise-Aisne, Meuse-Argonne

Commanders
- Notable commanders: Ernst von Pfuel; Max von Gallwitz; Gerhard Tappen

The 15th Division (15. Division) was a unit of the Prussian/German Army. It was formed as the 16th Division on September 5, 1818, in Cologne from the 4th Brigade of the Army Corps in France. It became the 15th Division on December 14, 1818. The division was subordinated in peacetime to the VIII Army Corps (VIII. Armeekorps). The division was disbanded in 1919 during the demobilization of the German Army after World War I. It was recruited in the densely populated Prussian Rhine Province, mainly in the Lower Rhine region.

== Combat chronicle ==
The 15th Division fought in the Austro-Prussian War in 1866, seeing action in the Battle of Königgrätz. In the Franco-Prussian War of 1870-71, the division fought in the Battle of Gravelotte (also called the Battle of Gravelotte-St. Privat) and the Siege of Metz, and then in the battles of Amiens, Hallue, Bapaume, and St. Quentin.

During World War I, the division marched through Luxembourg, Belgium and France, in what became known to the Allies as the Great Retreat, culminating in the First Battle of the Marne. In 1916, it fought in the Battle of the Somme. It was briefly sent to the Eastern Front in late 1916. It participated in the 1918 German spring offensive, and defended against the Allied counteroffensives, including the battles of Oise-Aisne and Meuse-Argonne. Allied intelligence rated it as a good but second class division.

== Order of battle in the Franco-Prussian War ==
During wartime, the 15th Division, like other regular German divisions, was redesignated an infantry division. The organization of the 15th Infantry Division in 1870 at the beginning of the Franco-Prussian War was as follows:

- 29. Infanterie-Brigade
  - Füsilier-Regiment Nr. 33
  - Infanterie-Regiment Nr. 65
- 30. Infanterie-Brigade
  - Infanterie-Regiment Nr. 28
  - Infanterie-Regiment Nr. 67
- Jäger-Bataillon Nr. 8
- Königs-Husaren-Regiment Nr. 7

== Pre-World War I organization ==
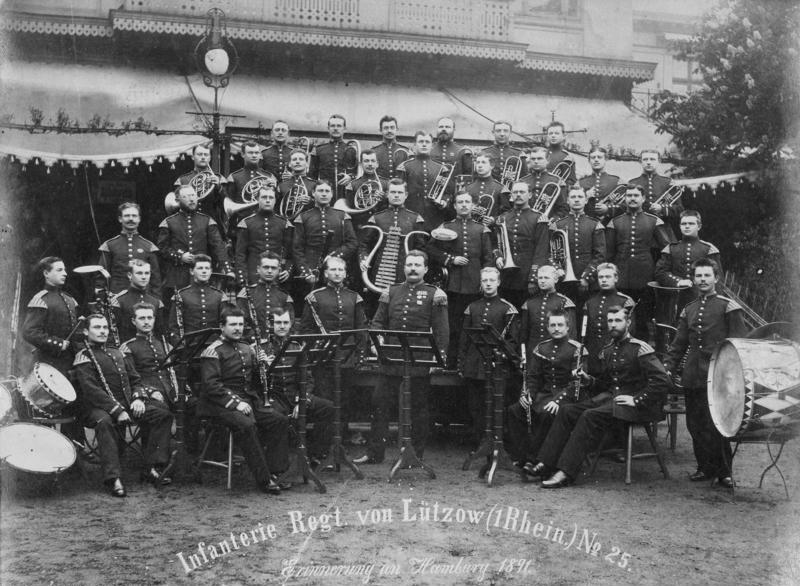
Musicians of Infanterie-Regiment von Lützow (1. Rheinisches) Nr. 25 in 1891

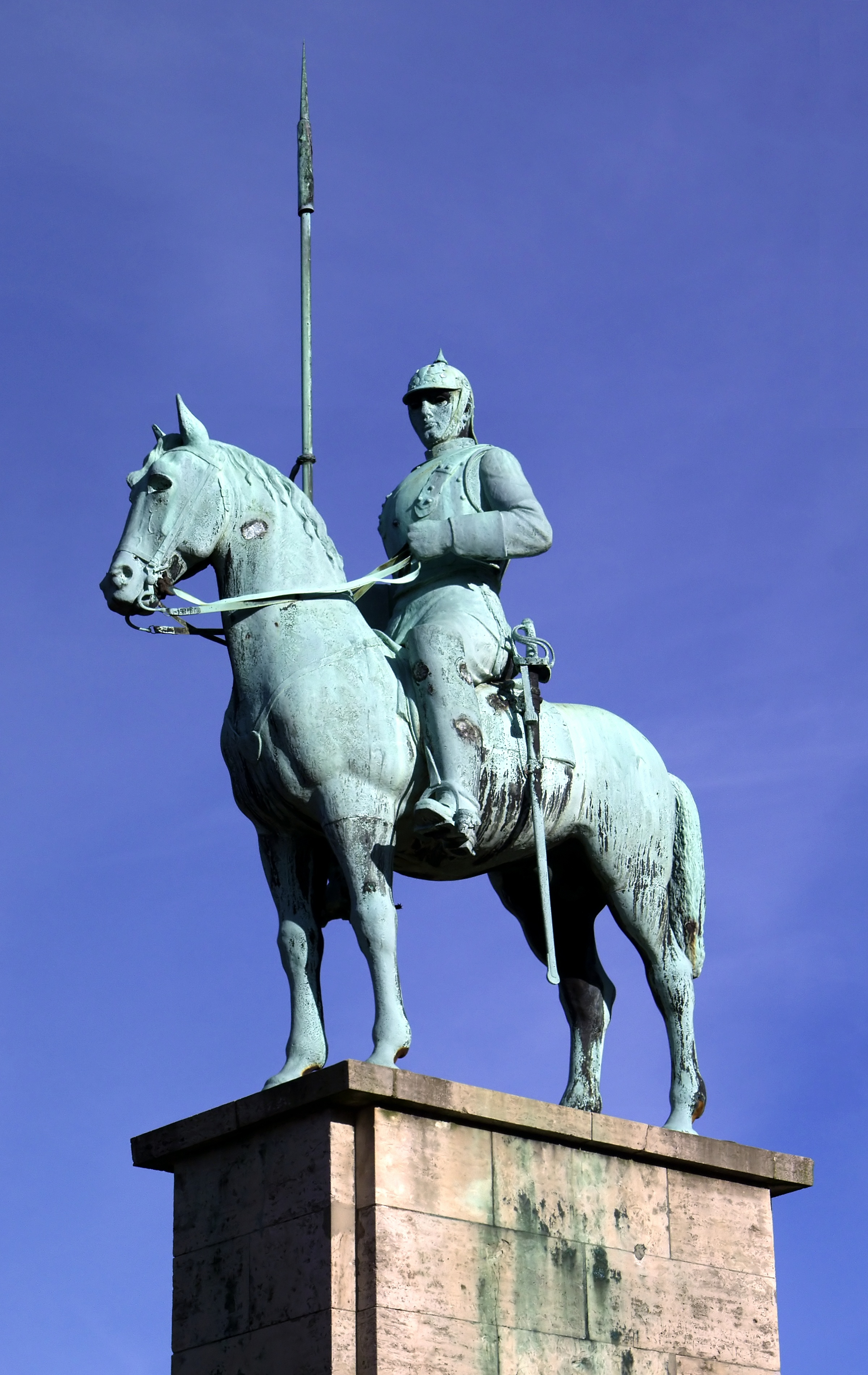
Memorial for the "Kürassier-Regiment Graf Geßler (Rheinisches) Nr. 8" in Deutz, a suburb of Cologne

German divisions underwent various organizational changes after the Franco-Prussian War. The 15th Division's 30th Infantry Brigade went to the 16th Division in exchange for the 80th Infantry Brigade, formed in 1897. The organization of the 15th Division in 1914, shortly before the outbreak of World War I, was as follows:

- 29. Infanterie Brigade
  - Infanterie-Regiment von Lützow (1. Rheinisches) Nr. 25
  - 10. Rheinisches Infanterie-Regiment Nr. 161
- 80. Infanterie Brigade
  - 5. Rheinisches Infanterie-Regiment Nr. 65
  - 9. Rheinisches Infanterie-Regiment Nr. 160
- 15. Kavallerie-Brigade
  - Kürassier-Regiment Graf Geßler (Rheinisches) Nr. 8
  - Husaren-Regiment König Wilhelm I. (1. Rheinisches) Nr. 7
- 15. Feldartillerie-Brigade
  - Bergisches Feldartillerie-Regiment Nr. 59
  - 3. Rheinisches Feldartillerie-Regiment Nr. 83
- Landwehr-Inspektion Cöln

== Order of battle on mobilization ==
On mobilization in August 1914 at the beginning of World War I, most divisional cavalry, including brigade headquarters, was withdrawn to form cavalry divisions or split up among divisions as reconnaissance units. Divisions received engineer companies and other support units from their higher headquarters. The 15th Division was again renamed the 15th Infantry Division. Its initial wartime organization was as follows:

- 29. Infanterie-Brigade:
  - Infanterie-Regiment von Lützow (1. Rheinisches) Nr. 25
  - 10. Rheinisches Infanterie-Regiment Nr. 161
- 80.Infanterie-Brigade:
  - 5. Rheinisches Infanterie-Regiment Nr. 65
  - 9. Rheinisches Infanterie-Regiment Nr. 160
- Kürassier-Regiment Graf Geßler (Rheinisches) Nr. 8
- 15. Feldartillerie-Brigade:
  - Bergisches Feldartillerie-Regiment Nr. 59
  - 3. Rheinisches Feldartillerie-Regiment Nr. 83
- 1./1. Rheinisches Pionier-Bataillon Nr. 8

== Late World War I organization ==
Divisions underwent many changes during the war, with regiments moving from division to division, and some being destroyed and rebuilt. During the war, most divisions became triangular - one infantry brigade with three infantry regiments rather than two infantry brigades of two regiments (a "square division"). An artillery commander replaced the artillery brigade headquarters, the cavalry was further reduced, the engineer contingent was increased, and a divisional signals command was created. The 15th Infantry Division's order of battle on April 7, 1918, was as follows:

- 80. Infanterie-Brigade:
  - 7. Rheinisches Infanterie-Regiment Nr. 69
  - 9. Rheinisches Infanterie-Regiment Nr. 160
  - Infanterie-Regiment Nr. 389
- 2.Eskadron/Husaren-Regiment König Wilhelm I (1. Rheinisches) Nr. 7
- Artillerie-Kommandeur 15:
  - Bergisches Feldartillerie-Regiment Nr. 59
  - Fußartillerie-Bataillon Nr. 135 (from 22.04.1918)
- Pionier-Bataillon Nr. 125
  - 1./1. Rheinisches Pionier-Bataillon Nr. 8
  - 5./1. Rheinisches Pionier-Bataillon Nr. 8
  - Minenwerfer-Kompanie Nr. 15
- Divisions-Nachrichten-Kommandeur 15
