= Battle of Bellevue =

Coordinates: 49.1203°N 6.1778°E

- Part of the Franco-Prussian War
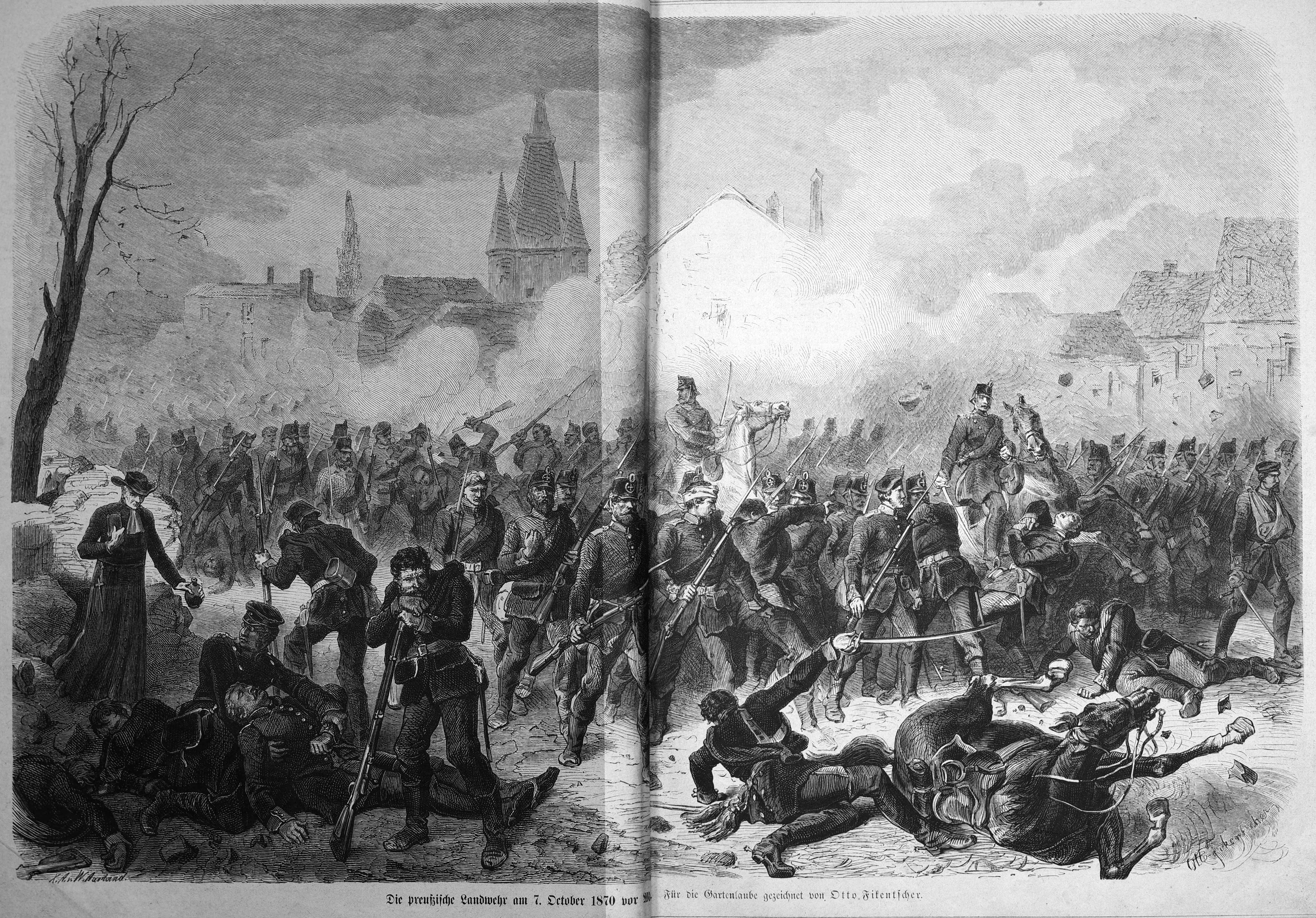
Date	7 October 1870
Location	near Metz, France
Result	Prussian victory

Belligerents
North German Confederation: Prussia	French Empire

Commanders and leaders
Ferdinand von Kummer	François Achille Bazaine

Strength
40,000	36,000

Casualties and losses
1,300 killed or wounded 500 captured	1,200 killed or wounded 100 captured

The Battle of Bellevue on 7 October 1870 was fought during the Franco-Prussian War and ended in a Prussian victory.

The French forces under Marshal François Achille Bazaine attempted to break through the lines of the Prussians investing Metz. They were unsuccessful and were driven back into the city with a loss of 1,300 men, including 71 officers. The Prussians lost 1,800 men, including 79 officers.
