= VIII Army Corps (German Confederation) =

The VIII Army Corps (German: VIII. Armee-Korps) was a mixed corps of the army of the German Confederation (the Bundesheer), which was made up of contingents from Württemberg, Baden and Hesse. Until 1830 (Note: In 1839, the tiny contingents of the 18 small and very small states were dropped from the Army Corps' order of battle to which they had hitherto been assigned because, tactically, they represented a hindrance due to the disparity in their training and equipment. They were incorporated into the Reserve Division.) contingents from Hohenzollern-Sigmaringen, Hohenzollern-Hechingen and Liechtenstein also belonged to this corps.

== Organisation ==
The Corps was intended to assemble on mobilisation. (Note: Ernst Rudolf Huber (1960). Deutsche Verfassungsgeschichte seit 1789, Vol. 1, Kohlhammer Verlag, Stuttgart, 2nd revised ed. pp. 611 ff. "If Parliament decided to call up the Bundesheer (mobilisation), the contingents were to be brought to full war readiness by calling up the reservists and those on leave. Not until this 'formation of the wartime army' did the federal contingents held at readiness by individual states come together into an effective federal army, which was then given a joint commander, the Bundesoberfeldherrn.") In peacetime no specific units or formations were assigned to it; only the strengths of the individual contingents were laid down.

The commandant of the mixed corps was appointed by joint agreement of the contributing nations. The individual states appointed the commanders of the subordinate units.

The lack of standardization of the Bundesheer was also reflected in the VIII Corps. It had no standard regulations, the rank badges differed from another as did the "promotion criteria, wages and salaries, the rations, the norms for general service and the operation of the military justice system, the lengths of service and the methods of reimbursement were also different. ... even in 1859 the Württemberg attack signal was the same as the Baden signal to withdraw." The VIII Army Corps only had an understanding of the need to introduce weapons of the same calibre and train in joint manoeuvres.

=== Structure ===
The Corps had a planned order of battle of two divisions each of two brigades, each with two regiments.

=== Strength ===
The planned strengths of the contingents are given below

Federal state	Elements	Total	Jäger	Infantry	Cavalry	Artillery	Engineers	Guns
Württemberg	Various	13,955		10,826	1,994	1,145		18
Baden	Various	10,000		7,751	1,429	820		20
Hesse-Darmstadt	Various	6,195		4,820	885	508		12

In addition, until 1830 there were the following:

Federal state	Elements	Total	Jäger	Infantry	Cavalry	Artillery	Engineers	Guns
Hohenzollern-Sigmaringen	2 companies	356		356				
Hohenzollern-Hechingen	1 company	155		155				
Liechtenstein	1 platoon	55		55				

== Wartime service ==
The Corps' mobilisation for the Crimean War in 1855 and the Upper Italian War in 1859 both proved to be a disaster. "An atmosphere of depressing amateurism reigned at the headquarters of the VIII Army Corps in Stuttgart; this applied even more to its troops which had few trained or even useful men. The mobilised army conveyed the impression of a rusty mess. Although it had given itself three months to mobilise instead of the allocated four weeks, it was still only partly ready for war."

In the First Schleswig War of 1848–1851 and in the fighting in the Baden Revolution, only individual elements of the Corps from the contingent-sending states were deployed (e.g. the Neckar Corps).

=== Austro-Prussian War of 1866 ===
In the Austro-Prussian War the Corps took part in the Campaign of the Main. But even the appointment of the commander of the VIII Army Corps led to conflict between the "allies" in 1866. Both Prince William of Baden (the younger brother of Grand Duke Frederick), as well as Prince Frederick of Württemberg (a cousin of the King of Württemberg) contended for the command. Austria, however, wanted to fill the post with its own candidate and pushed for the appointment of one of the allied officers in Austrian service, Lieutenant Field Marshal Alexander of Hesse-Darmstadt. This was eventually accepted under duress after Austria had released him from his oath of allegiance to Austria. This appointment was then made on 14 June 1866 by King Charles I of Württemberg, who had the formal right to do so. Alexander received his appointment on 16 June and was sworn in on 18 June in Darmstadt. In his own words he accepted the command "with very little hope and only extremely unwillingly". The chief of the general staff was the Württemberg lieutenant general, Fidel von Baur-Breitenfeld. The army corps was not fully up to strength until 9 July (i.e. about a week after the decisive Battle of Königgrätz). After the VIII Corps had also been allocated troops from the Electorate of Hesse and the Duchy of Nassau (originally part of the IX Corps) and an Austrian brigade (formerly garrisoning the German Federal Fortresses), units of 6 sovereign states were now members of this formation. As early as 9 August – after a failed campaign – Alexander resigned his command and felt it necessary to publish his campaign journal in order to defend himself from the numerous attacks on his leadership. The Corps, together with the VII Army Corps of the Confederation, which was entirely made up of Bavarian Army troops, formed the "West German Army". This was placed on 28 June 1866 under the command of the 71-year-old Prince Charles of Bavaria. Its chief of the general staff was Ludwig von der Tann-Rathsamhausen – an opponent of the German "war of brothers".

On 1 June 1866, military representatives of the south German central powers met in Munich. Baden, Württemberg and Hesse-Darmstadt pledged about 45,000 men for the campaign – in fact these states only provided about 35,000 men, and then only in early August instead of mid-June. After the Battle of Königgrätz they lost the will for unity, so that the Campaign of the Main was doomed to failure from the start and the battles of Frohnhofen, Aschaffenburg, Hundheim, Tauberbischofsheim, Werbach, and Gerchsheim were merely an accompaniment to the efforts already initiated everywhere to establish a cease-fire, with each of the central powers only pursuing its own interests.

Nevertheless, the losses of the corps amounted to 402 dead, 1,439 wounded, 118 prisoners 2,444 missing; the number of missing men almost certainly including more deaths.

== Gallery ==
Order of battle of the VIII Federal Army Corps in contemporary illustrations:

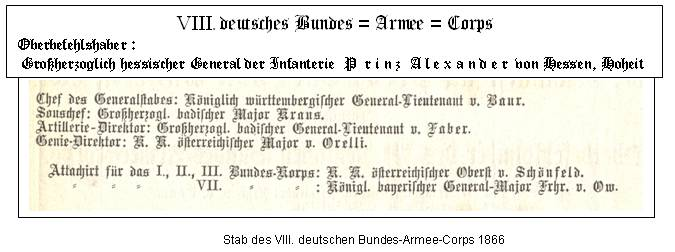
Staff of the VIII Army Corps in 1866

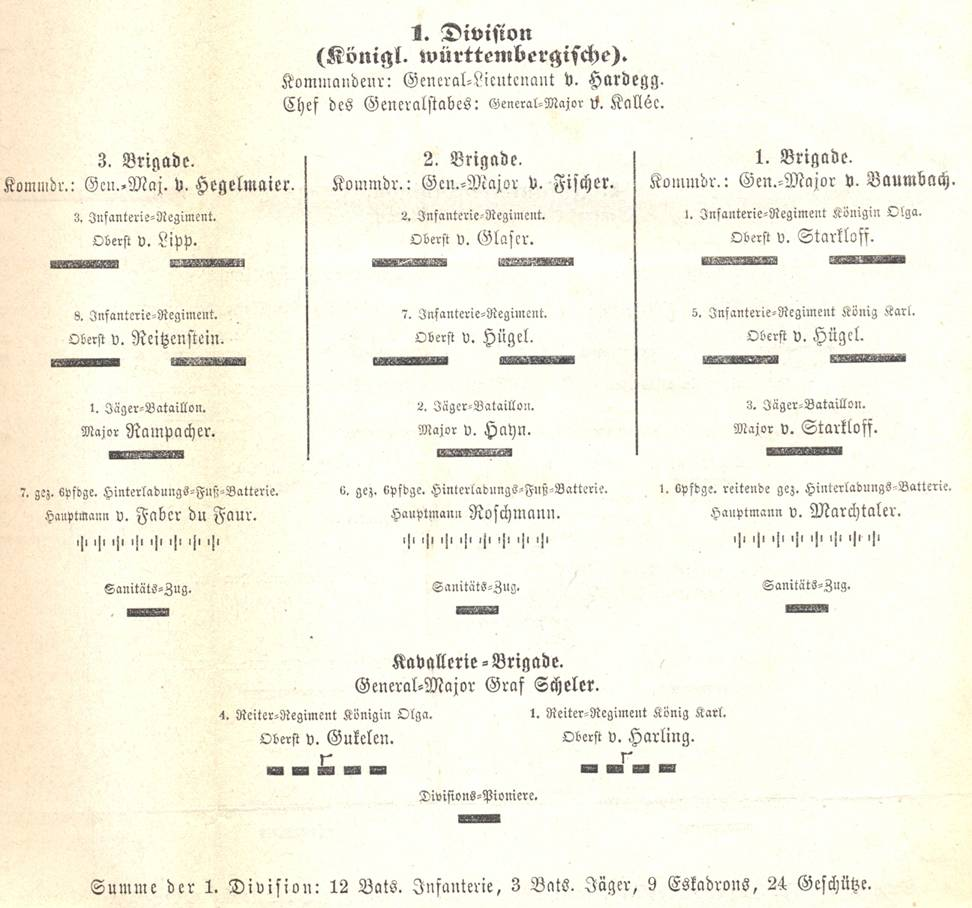
1st (Württ.) Division of the VIII Army Corps in 1866

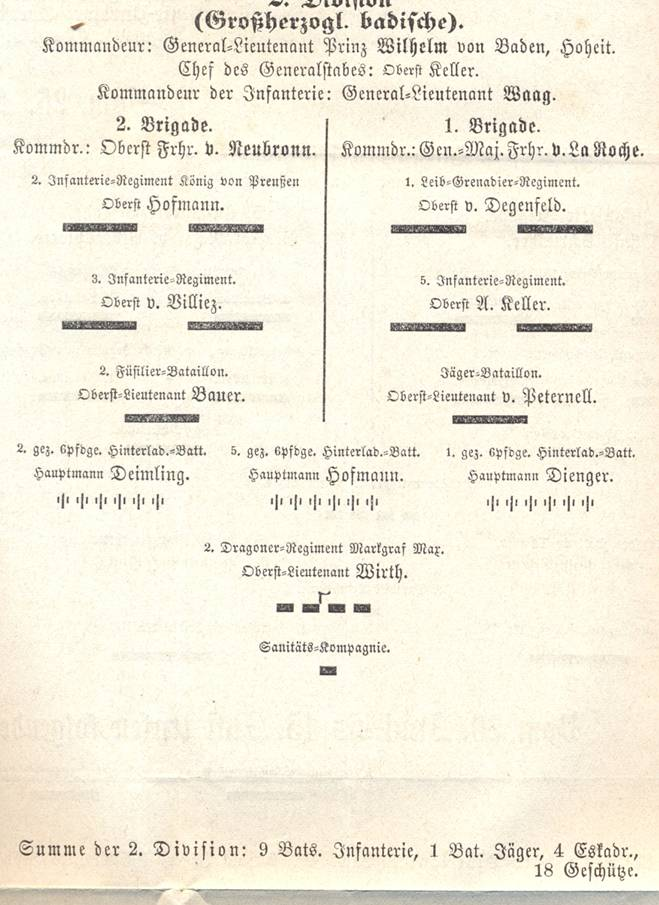
2. (Bad.) Division of the VIII Army Corps in 1866

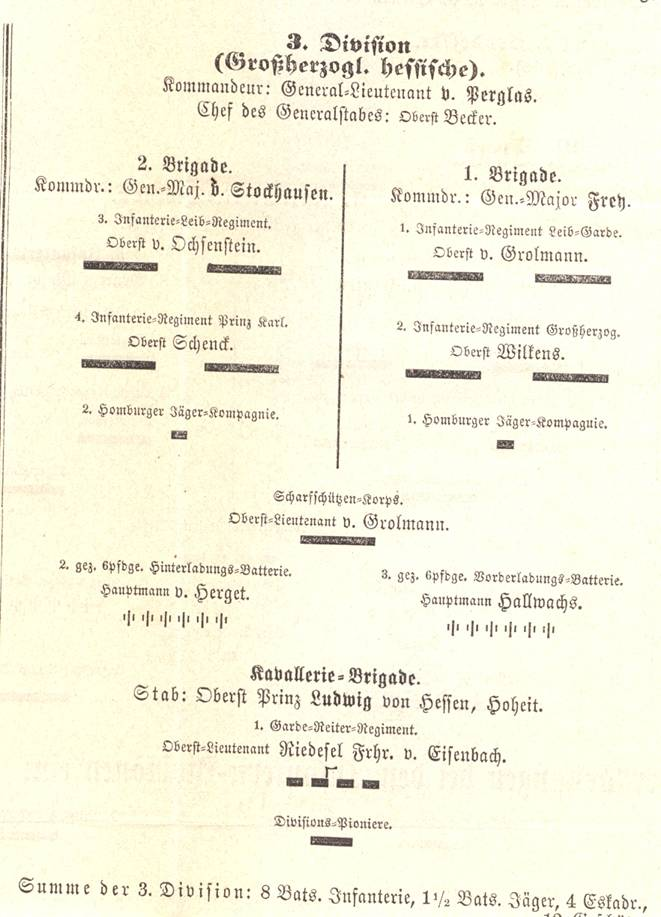
3rd (Hess.) Division of the VIII Army Corps in 1866

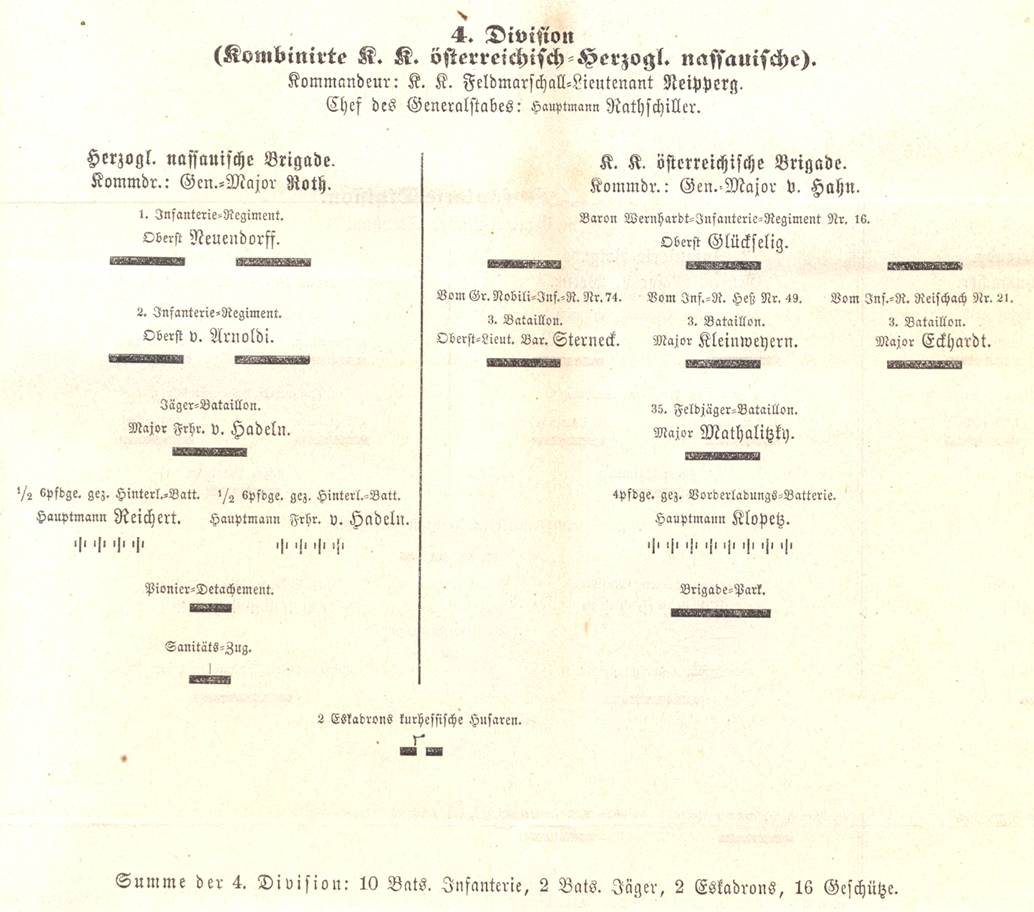
4th (Combined) Division of the VIII Army Corps in 1866

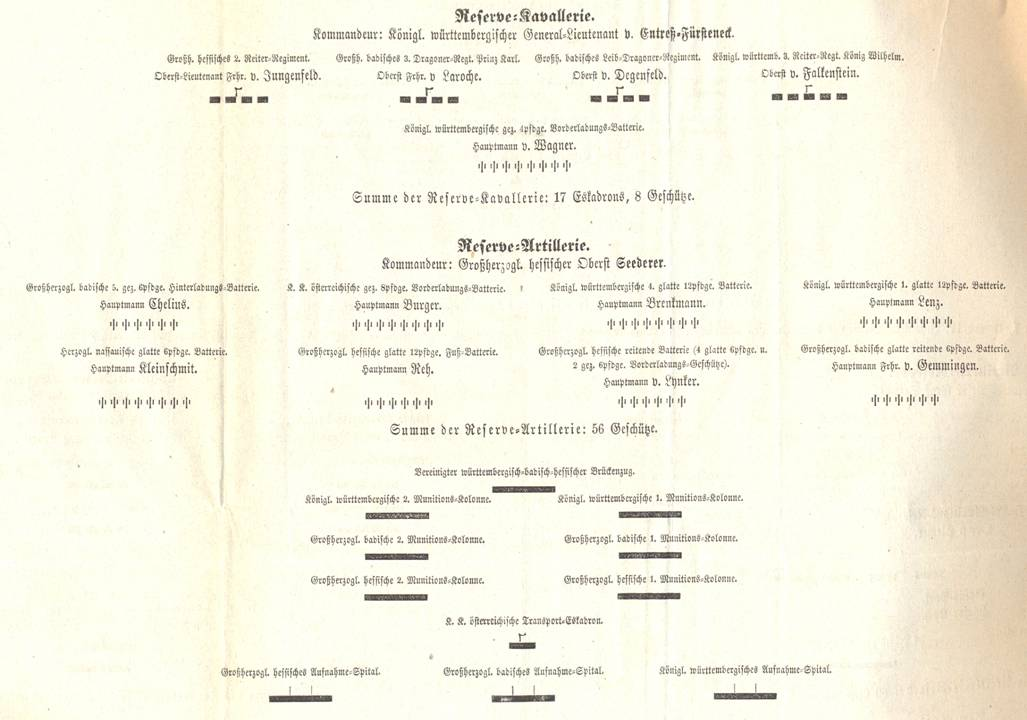
Reserve cavalry and reserve artillery of the Army Corps in 1866
