= Battle of Tauberbischofsheim =

1866 Austro-Prussian War battle

Coordinates: 49°37′21″N 09°39′46″E

- Part of the Austro-Prussian War
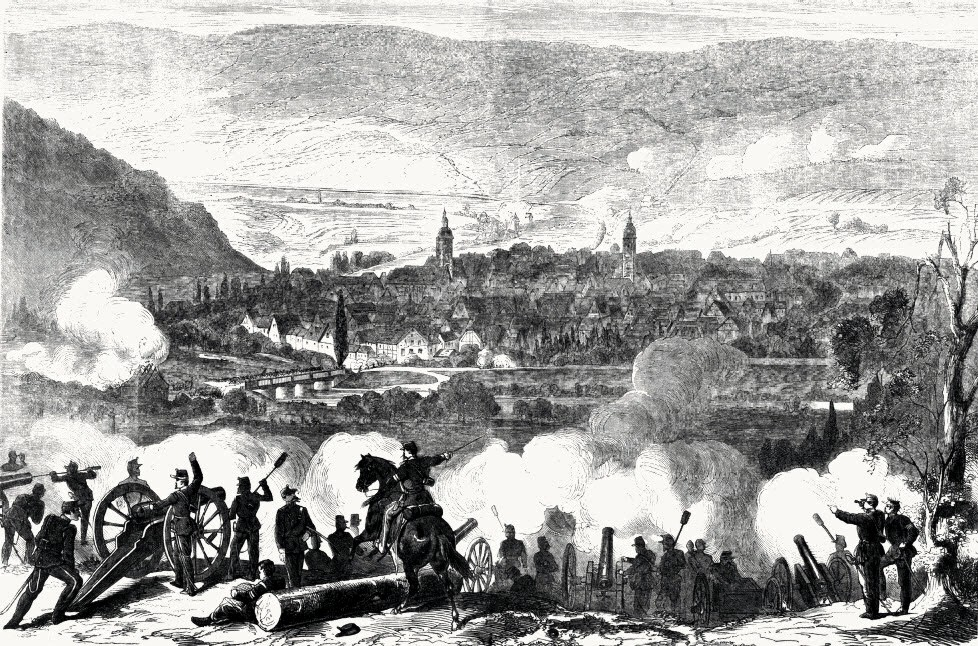
- Württemberg artillery in the battle
Date	24 July 1866
Location	Tauberbischofsheim, Baden
Result	Prussian victory

Belligerents
(Kingdom of Prussia) Prussia	Württemberg; Baden; Hesse-Darmstadt; Austria; Nassau

Commanders and leaders
(Kingdom of Prussia) Edwin von Manteuffel	Prince Alexander

Strength
60,000	42,000 (VIII Army Corps)

Casualties and losses
16 killed 107 wounded 3 missed or captured Total: 126	62 killed 455 wounded 192 missed or captured Total: 709

The Battle of Tauberbischofsheim was an engagement of the Austro-Prussian War of 1866, on the 24 July at Tauberbischofsheim in the Grand Duchy of Baden between troops of the German Confederation and the Kingdom of Prussia. It was part of the campaign of the Main and ended with a Prussian victory.

== Preliminary campaign ==
After the Prussian Mainarmee (German for: army of the river Main) had beaten the Bavarians at Kissingen, the Bavarian army retreated to Würzburg. The Prussians now turned west against the 8th Confederate Army (troops of Württemberg, Baden, Hesse and Nassau) which protected Frankfurt. After the 8th Army had lost the Battle of Frohnhofen, near Aschaffenburg, it gave up the defence of Frankfurt and went south-eastward to unite with the Bavarians at the river Tauber. The Prussian army followed.

== The battle ==
The 8th Army, consisting of four divisions under the command of Prince Alexander of Hesse, was distributed to the following places on the day of the battle: The Württemberg division was in the centre at Tauberbischofsheim, the Baden division on the right flank at Werbach, the Grand Ducal Hessian division at Großrinderfeld and a division mixed of troops from Austria and Nassau on the left flank at Grünsfeld-Paimar. The Prussians were able to push back the federal troops in Tauberbischofsheim. The counter attacks failed and troops of Württemberg suffered a comprehensive defeat. At Werbach the troops of Baden were also beaten.

== Aftermath ==
After further clashes the next two days at Gerchsheim, Uettingen, Helmstadt and Roßbrunn, which ended in favor of the Prussians, the federal troops withdrew to Würzburg where a truce ended the fighting. The Prussians occupied northern Württemberg and negotiated a peace in August 1866. Württemberg paid an indemnity of 8,000,000 gulden, and concluded a secret offensive and defensive treaty with her conqueror.

Although not officially part of the North German Confederation, the secret treaty effectively bound Württemberg to Prussia. A few years later, in 1870, Württemberger troops played a creditable part in the Battle of Wörth and in other operations of the Franco-Prussian War. In 1871, Württemberg became a member of the new German Empire.

=== Memorials ===
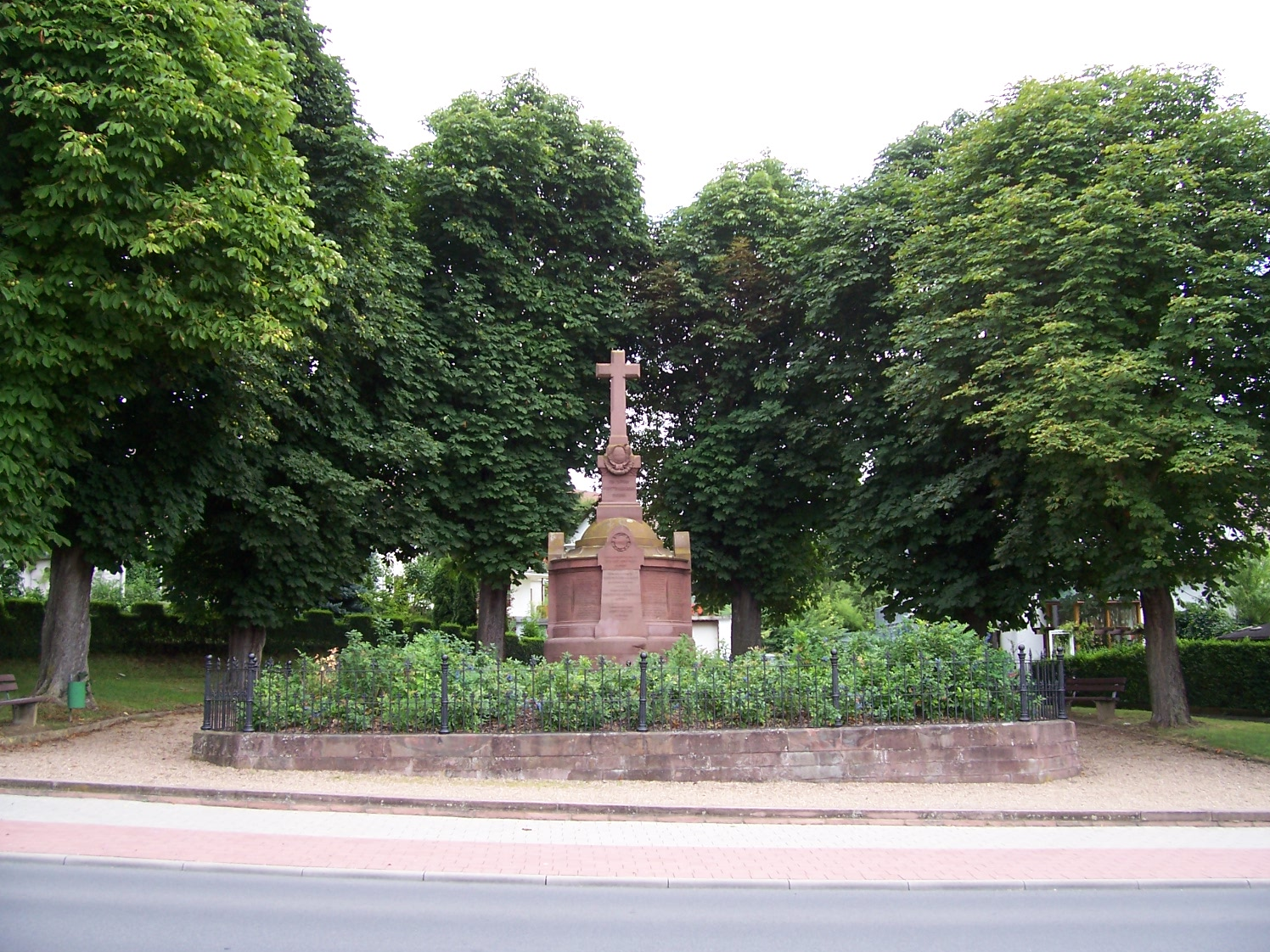
Monument to the Wurttemberg Fallen

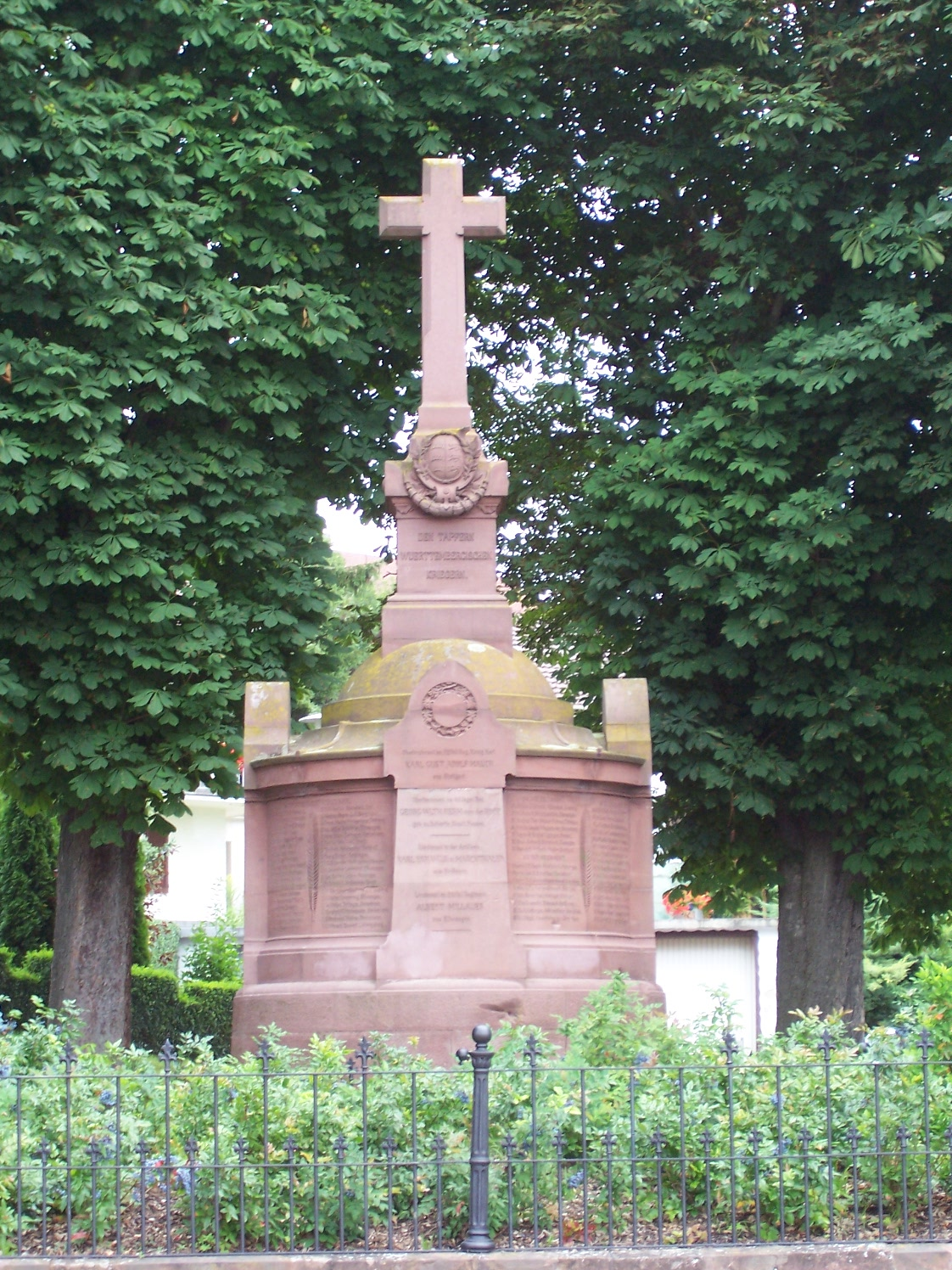
Monument to the Wurttemberg Fallen
