= Battle of Aschaffenburg (1866) =

- Part of Austro-Prussian War
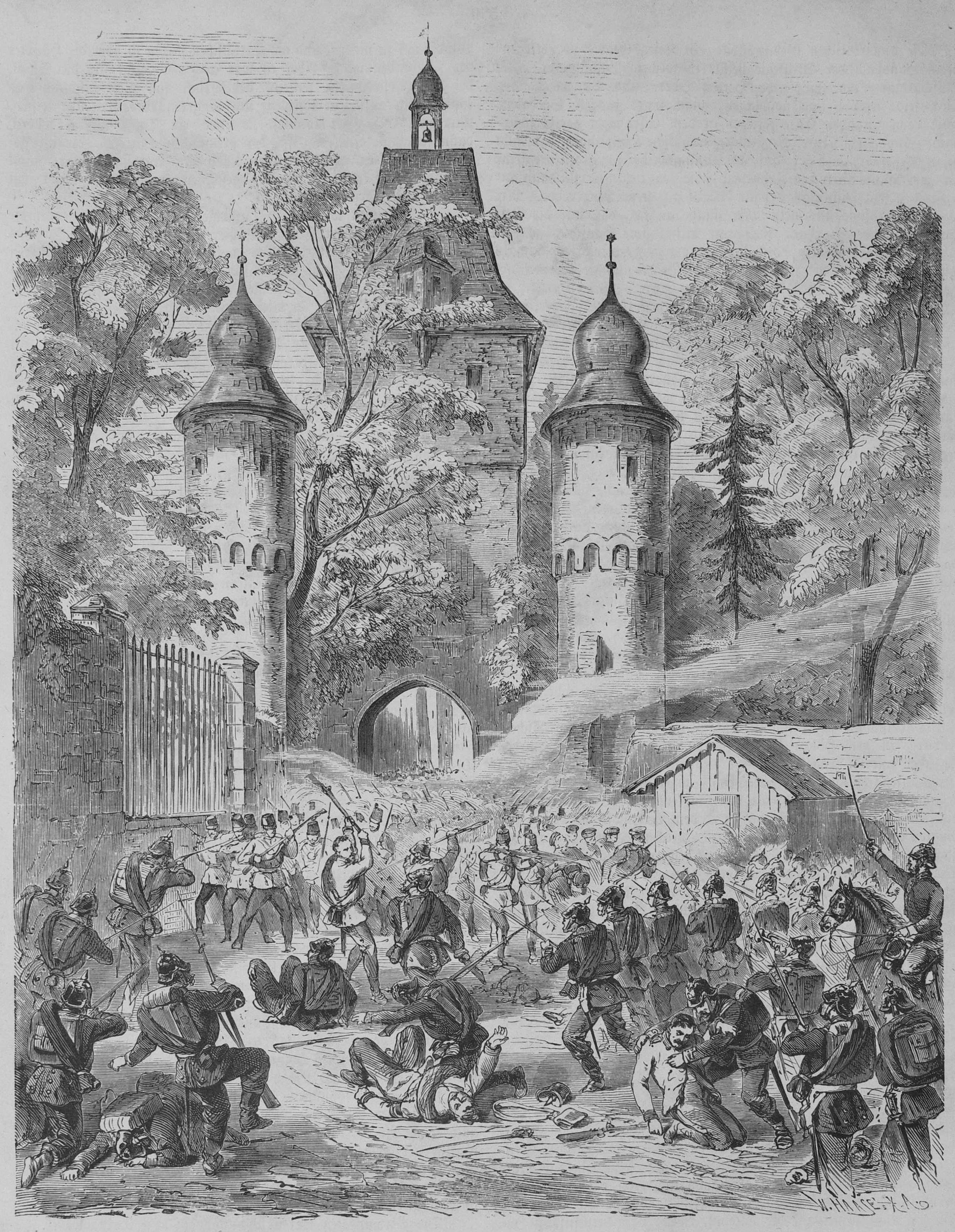
- Fight at Herstaller Tor in Aschaffenburg, based on an original drawing by W.A. Beer.
Date	14 July 1866
Location	Aschaffenburg, Bavaria 49°58′47″N 9°09′51″E
Result	Prussian Victory

Belligerents
Prussia	Austrian Empire; Hesse-Kassel; Hesse-Darmstadt

Commanders and leaders
August Karl von Goeben; Ferdinand von Kummer	Erwin von Neipperg

Units involved
13th Division	4th Division, VIII Corps

Strength
16,600	7,900

Casualties and losses
27 dead; 144 wounded, 9 missing soldiers and prisoners	226 dead; 484 wounded, 1,759 missing soldiers and prisoners: 25 officers 481 dead and wounded, 22 officers and 1,964 men captured; 4 officers 14 men dead and wounded, 4 officers and 52 men captured; 3 officers 12 men dead and wounded, 5 prisoners
- Location within Germany Battle of Aschaffenburg (1866) (Europe)

The Battle of Aschaffenburg, sometimes also called The Skirmishes Near Aschaffenburg, was a battle of the Austro-Prussian War on 14 July 1866 between pitting the armies of Prussia on the one hand and parts of the VIII Corps of the German Federal Army on the other side which primarily consisted of soldiers from the Austrian Empire, Hesse-Darmstadt and Hesse-Kassel.

== History ==
The Prussians under General August Karl von Goeben advanced over the Spessart on 14 July 1866, where they had been involved in a battle with Hessian-Darmstadt troops near Laufach the day before . To defend Aschaffenburg, the federal troops had taken up positions along the railway line and in the pheasantry east of the city. Most of the federal troops were Austrian troops from the Brigade Major General von Hahn under the command of division commander Field Marshal Lieutenant Erwin von Neipperg, as well as some remaining Hessian contingents. After heavy mutual artillery fire, the Prussians attacked via the pheasantry. The Austrian troops finally had to retreat into the city across open fields, suffering great losses from Prussian rapid fire. The Prussians finally stormed the Herstalltor and penetrated the city, which they conquered in fierce street fights. The federal troops had to move west across the Main. Only the only bridge in the city was available to them for this, as the railway bridge at Stockstadt was already occupied by the Prussians. However, a Prussian detachment under General Ferdinand von Kummer quickly reached the bridge before the city was completely conquered and cut off the retreat of the federal troops remaining in the city.

The day after, the Prussians occupied the city of Frankfurt am Main on 16 July.

In the area east of the city limits, where a large part of the fighting took place at that time, the Austrian memorial stands today, commemorating those who fell during those event.

== Eyewitness Accounts ==
According to a report in the Allgemeine Zeitung from Würzburg, the Prussians in Aschaffenburg, where they also disarmed the Landwehr after the fighting, “tore down the Bavarian coat of arms and planted their eagle with the inscription: 'Royal Prussian Post Office' at the post and railway office. "

A Colonel Keller reports from Babenhausen (15 km west of Aschaffenburg) in the condition of the Austrian soldiers who came from the battle near Aschaffenburg: 'Without weapons and equipment'. An Austrian officer told him that the soldiers, 'the Italians', had done very badly. Sometimes armed force had to be used to bring them to the front at all. ” The Italians were members of the Wernhardt regiment, defending the pheasantry. They were inexperienced recruits from the province of Treviso in the then Austrian Veneto. The Prussian account states that they "had fought bravely at the beginning of the battle, did not make any special efforts to make their way through the unfavorable turn of the battle and in many cases, only offered little resistance to capture."

== Regimental History ==
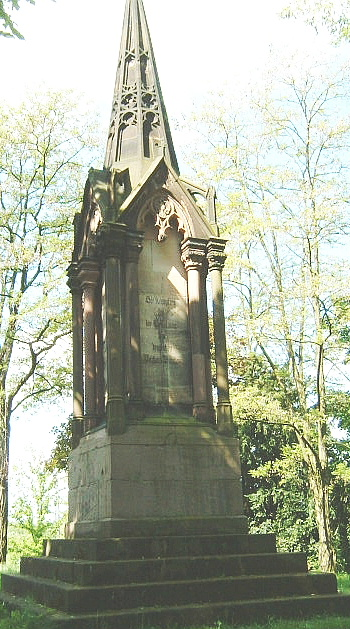
The Austrian monument in the Austrian colony in Aschaffenburg commemorates the Austrians who fell here

In the regimental history of the hussar regiment "Landgrave Friedrich II. Von Hessen-Homburg" (2nd Kurhessisches) No. 14, it is reported about the battles near Aschaffenburg that after the 4th field division had been defeated and withdrew over the Main, the hussars should take the rear guard. They tried to stop the advancing Prussians through attacks and foot fights. Now that the rest of the 4th Field Division had crossed the Main Bridge, the Hussars also began to retreat. But the Prussian infantry regiments No. 13 and 55 had already reached the Aschaffenburg Main Bridge and controlled this strategic point. Major Heusinger von Waldegg, the commander of the hussar regiment, used the similarity of the hussar uniforms to those of the Prussian hussars No. 8 in this situation. He led the Electorate Hussars to the bridge, saluted the Prussian general Ferdinand von Kummer and had his hussars march past him and the guards. He was the last to cross the bridge, and by the time the Prussians noticed the hussar and began to shoot, it was already too late.
