= Battle of St. Quentin (1871) =

Part of the Franco-Prussian War

Coordinates: 49.8486°N 3.2864°E

- Part of the Franco-Prussian War
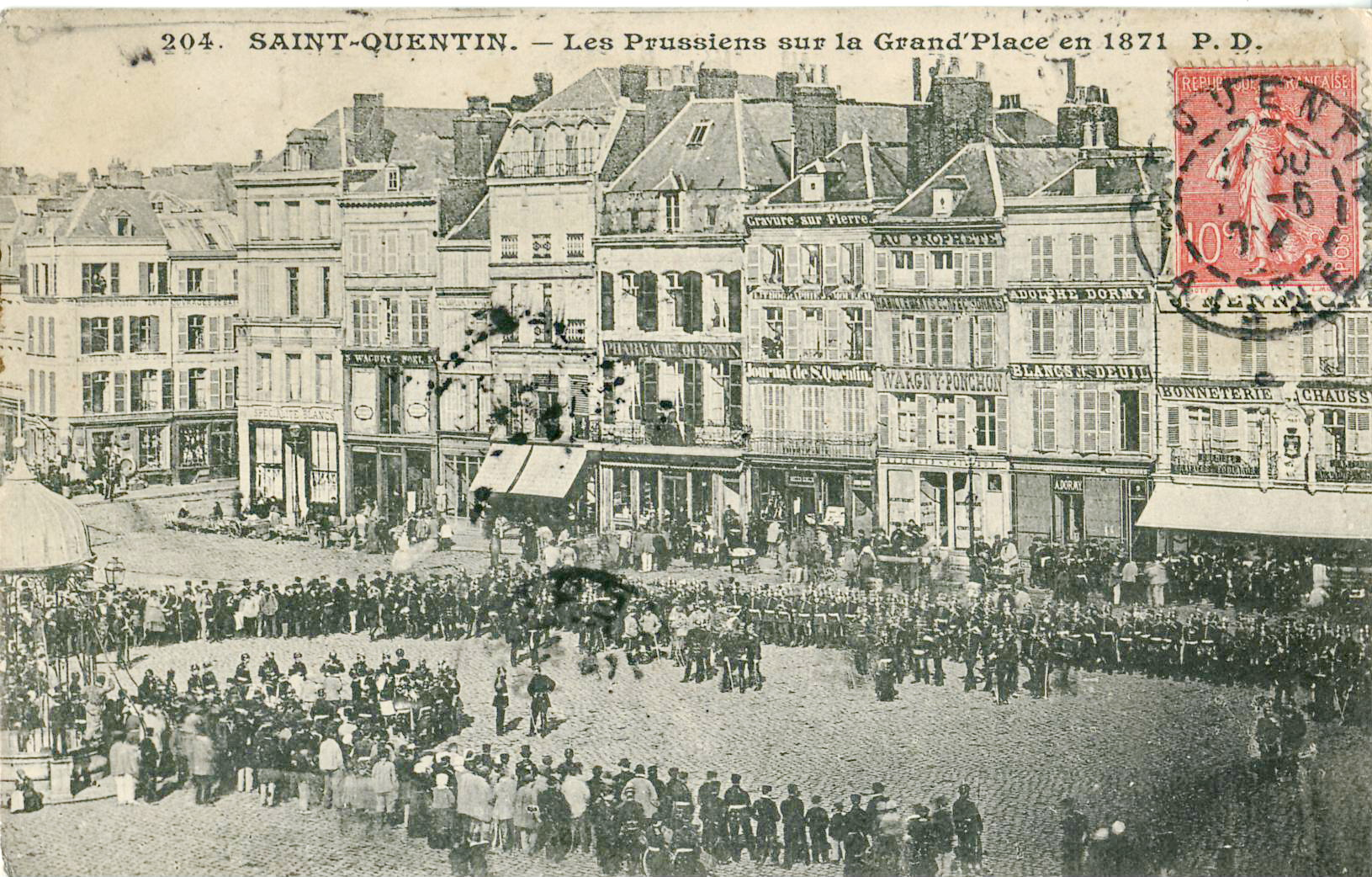
- Prussian forces in St. Quentin, 1871
Date	19 January 1871
Location	St. Quentin, France
Result	Prussian victory

Belligerents
German Empire	(French Third Republic) France

Commanders and leaders
August Karl von Goeben	Louis Faidherbe

Strength
33,000	40,000

Casualties and losses
2,500 killed or wounded 100 captured	3,500 killed and wounded 9,000 captured

The Battle of St. Quentin took place during the Franco-Prussian War when Prussian forces defeated French attempts to relieve the besieged city of Paris.

While the Prussian armies under Wilhelm I besieged Paris, the Prussian I Army, now under the command of August Karl von Goeben was sent to deal with French forces north of Paris. After a first attempt to relieve Paris had been checked at the battle of Bapaume, the French were planning another relief effort.

Von Goeben marched his army north and met the irregular French army under General Louis Faidherbe near Saint-Quentin. On 19 January the Prussians attacked and decisively defeated the French forces. The same day General Trochu attempted a breakout of Paris but it too was defeated. No other significant attempts would be made to lift the siege of Paris.

== Sources ==
- Compton's Home Library: Battles of the World
- History of the Franco Prussian War
