= Battle of Bapaume (1871) =

Part of the Franco-Prussian War

Coordinates: 50.1044°N 2.8519°E

- Part of the Franco-Prussian War
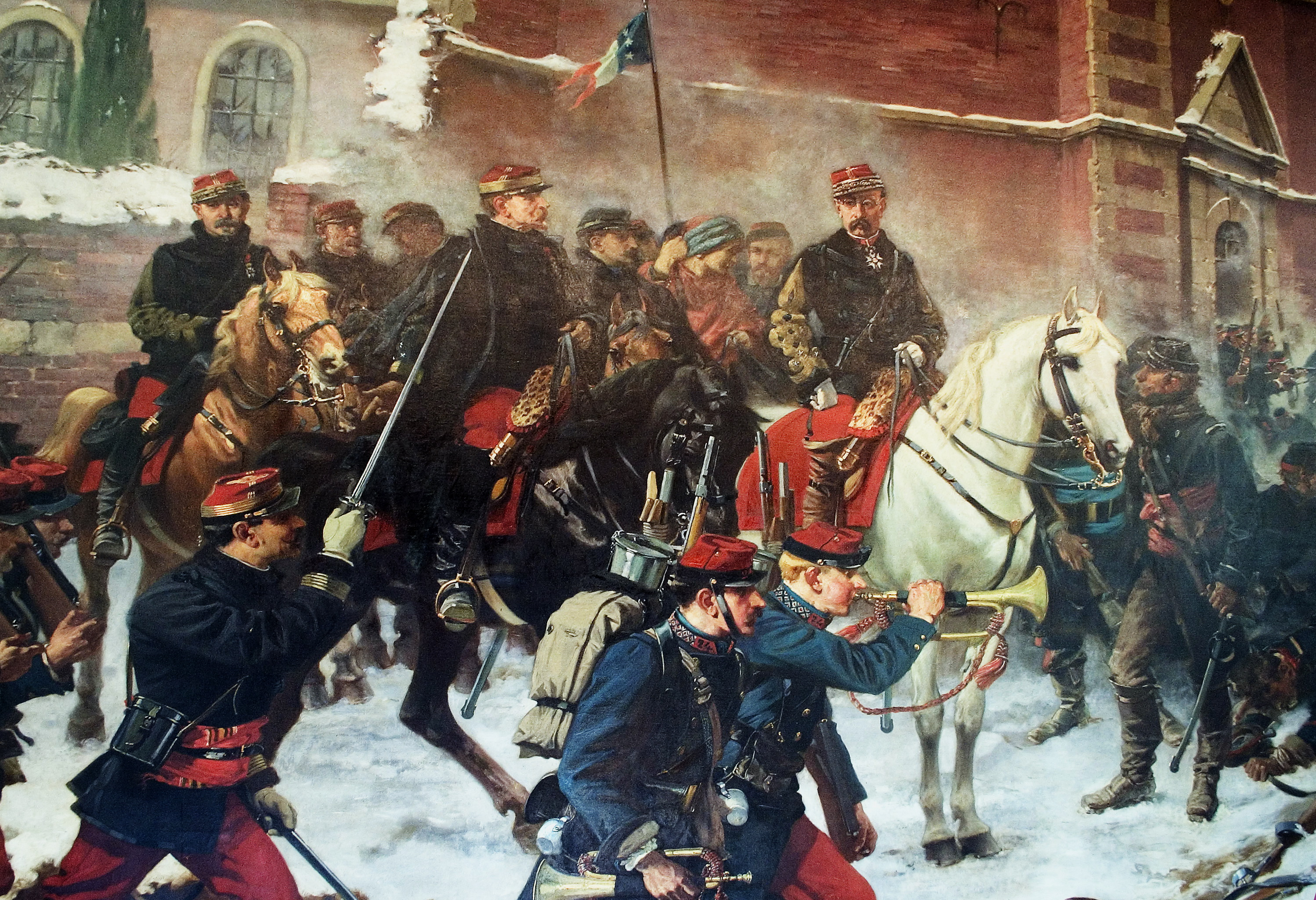
- Part of the panoramic painting "Battle of Bapaume" of Charles Édouard Armand-Dumaresq showing General Faidherbe.
Date	3 January 1871
Location	Bapaume, France
Result	French victory

Belligerents
North German Confederation: Prussia	French Republic

Commanders and leaders
Edwin Freiherr von Manteuffel	Louis Faidherbe

Strength
18,000	25,000

Casualties and losses
750 soldiers 52 officers	1,569 soldiers 53 officers

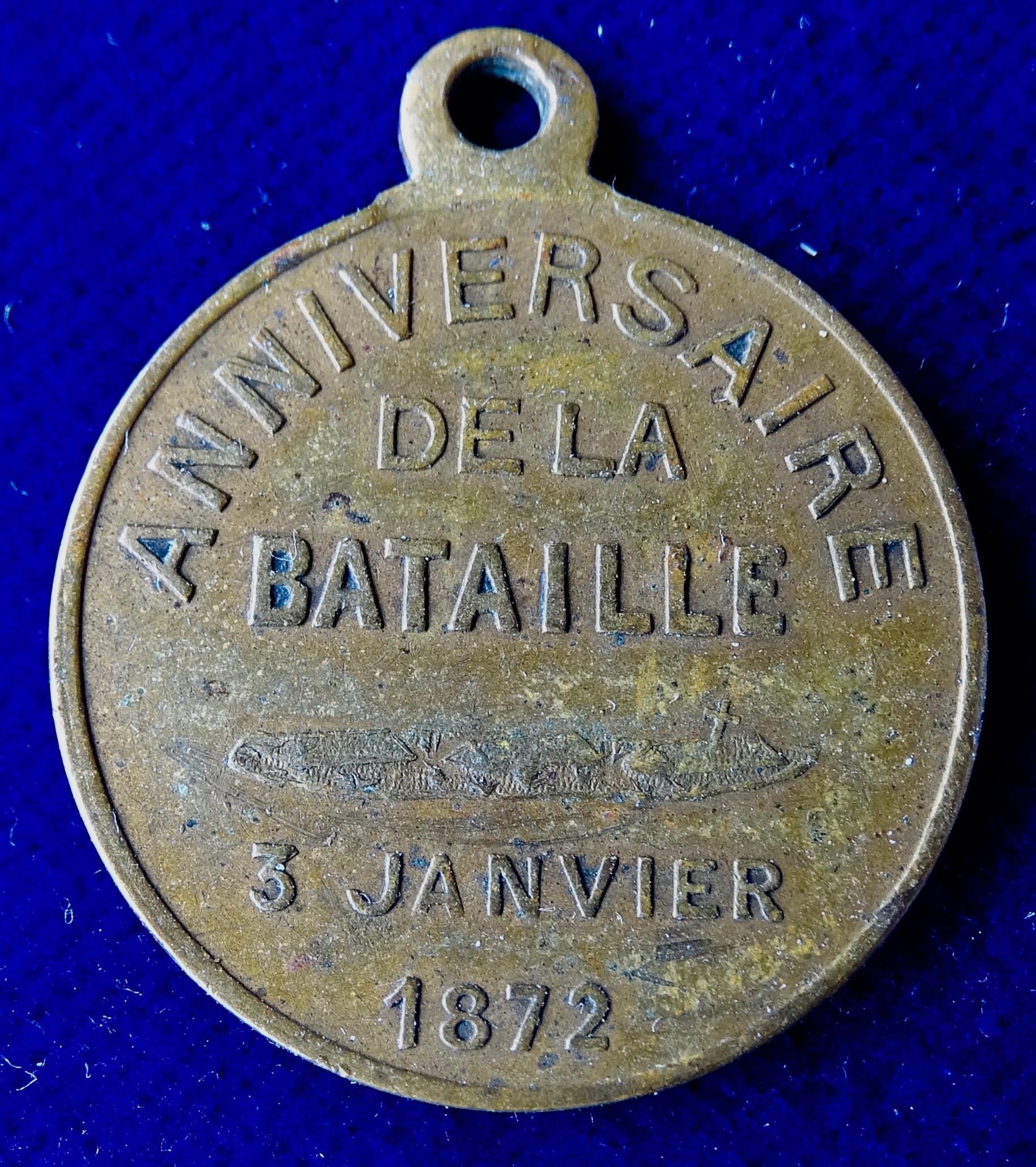
Battle of Bapaume 1st Anniversary Medal 1872, obverse

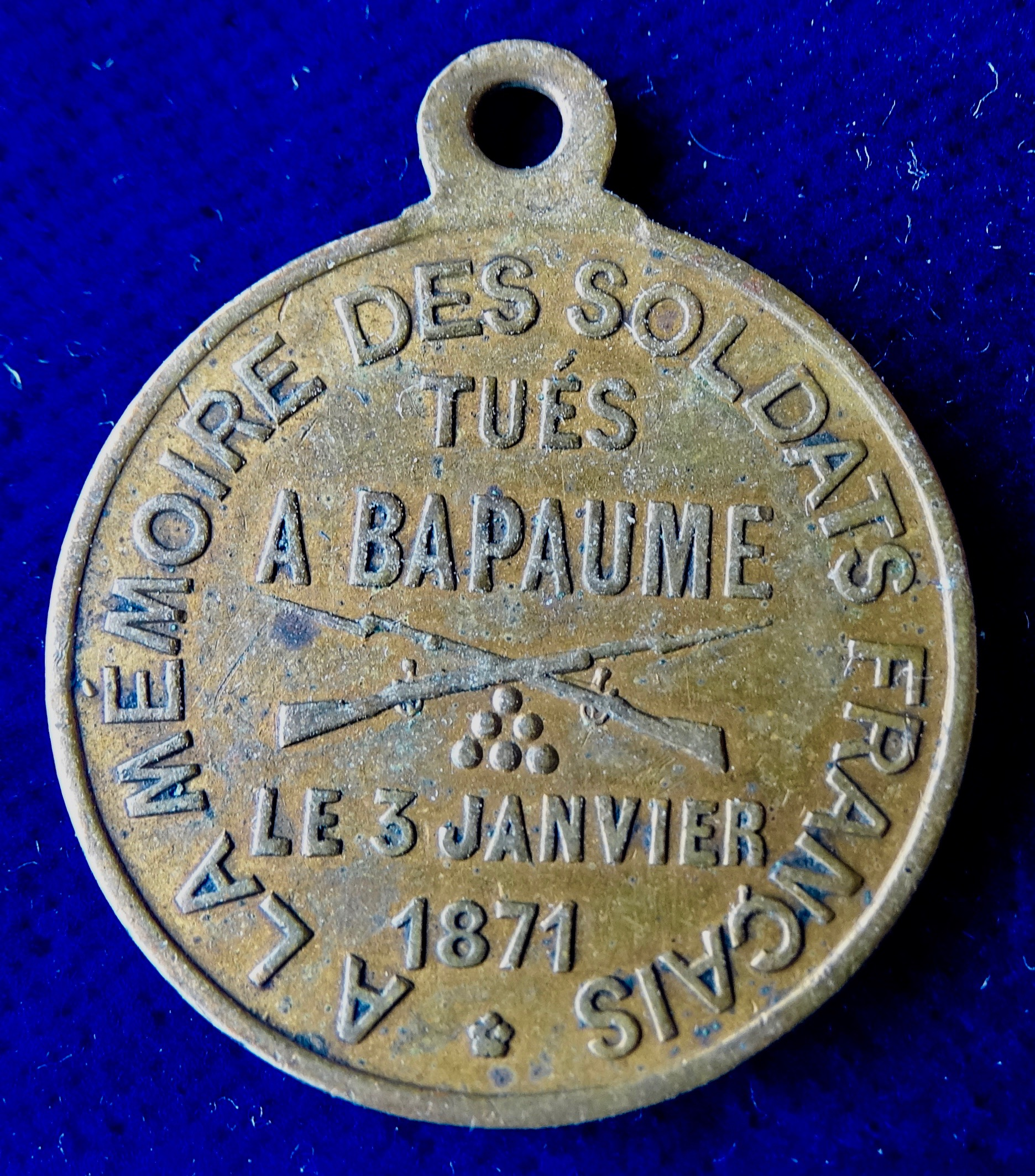
Battle of Bapaume 1st Anniversary Medal 1872, reverse

The Battle of Bapaume took place during the Franco-Prussian War, brought about by French attempts to relieve the besieged city of Péronne, Somme. The battle was fought on 3 January 1871 near the town of Bapaume.

The Prussian 1st Army had reached Bapaume at the end of December while at the same time the French Army of the North under Faidherbe moved out to break the German siege of Péronne. Both sides encountered each other near Bapaume. Although Faidherbe's green troops held their own against the outnumbered but experienced Prussians, they did not follow up their advantage. As a consequence, Péronne surrendered on 10 January. Soon the Prussians would be reinforced and two weeks later they would meet Faidherbe in battle again at Saint Quentin.
