= Campaign of the Main =

Campaign of the 1866 Austro-Prussian War

- Part of Austro-Prussian War of 1866
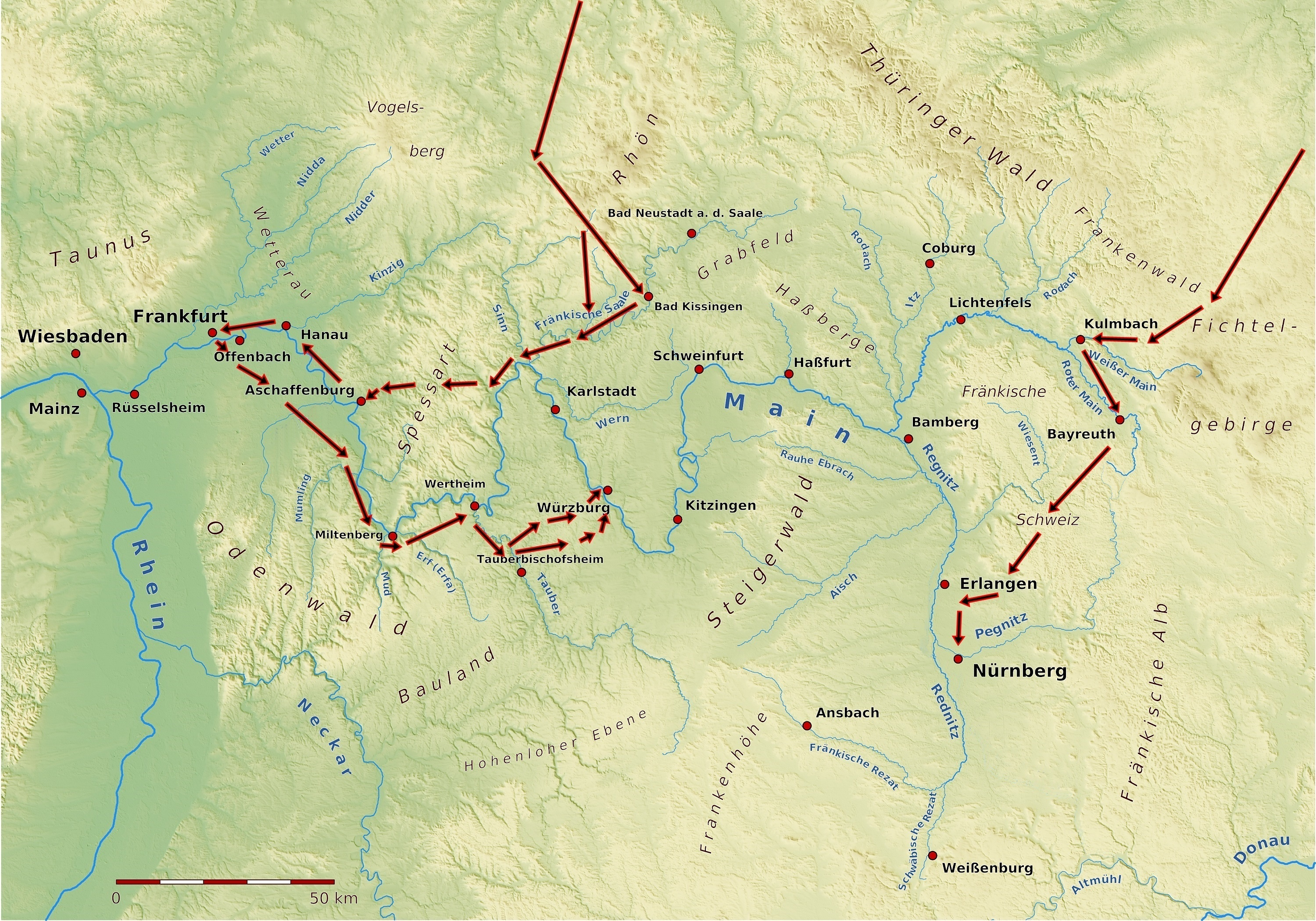
- Way of the Prussian Army in the campaign of the Main
Date	1 – 26 July 1866 (25 days)
Location	Hesse, Baden and Bavaria
Result	Prussian victory

Belligerents
(Kingdom of Prussia) Prussia; Saxe-Coburg & Gotha; Oldenburg; Lippe; Bremen	Bavaria; Württemberg; Hesse-Kassel; Baden; Hesse-Darmstadt; Nassau; Austria

Commanders and leaders
(Kingdom of Prussia) Edwin von Manteuffel; (Kingdom of Prussia) Eduard Vogel von Falckenstein	(Kingdom of Bavaria) Karl von Bayern; (Grand Duchy of Hesse) Alexander von Hessen-Darmstadt

Strength
3 divisions: 50,000 soldiers, thereof 41,000 infantry, 4,000 cavalry, 121 cannons	VIIth corps (Bavaria): 4 divisions and corps-reserve: 52,000 soldiers, 144 cannons VIIIth corps: 4 divisions (Württemberg, Baden, Hesse-Darmstadt, Austria / Nassau / Hesse-Kassel): 48,000 soldiers, 136 cannons

Casualties and losses
411 dead; 2,498 wounded; 153 missed	VIIth corps: 339 dead; 2,114 wounded; 1,604 missed VIIIth Korps: 402 dead; 1,439 wounded; 2,444 missed

The Campaign of the Main (in German: Mainfeldzug) was a campaign of the Prussian Army in the area of the River Main against the allies of Austria in southern Germany during the Austro-Prussian War of 1866.

== Preliminary campaign ==
While the greater part of the Prussian troops marched to Bohemia, where they defeated the Austrian and Saxon troops on 3 July 1866 at Königgrätz (Sadowa), another part of the Prussian troops invaded the Kingdom of Hanover. After the surrender of Hanover on June 29 these troops – including some small units of allies of Prussia – were grouped under the name Mainarmee (German for: Army of the Main) and pushed southward towards the River Main against the south German allies of Austria.

== Course ==
The allies of Austria had formed the VIIth and VIIIth Federal Corps of the German Confederation. Both corps had advanced northward to support Hanover. When Hanover surprisingly surrendered the VIIth Corps, formed by the Bavarians, stood in Thuringia. The VIIIth Corps, composed of troops from Hesse, Baden and Wuerttemberg, stood north of Frankfurt. At first the Prussians attacked the VIIth Corps. The Bavarian troops lost battles at Hünfeld and Dermbach on 4 July and withdrew to the Franconian Saale river. But the Prussians followed quickly across the mountains of the Rhön and beat the Bavarians in the battle of Kissingen and Hammelburg on 10 July.

Now the Bavarians retreated to Würzburg while the Prussians turned westward against the VIIIth Corps which protected Frankfurt. The Prussians crossed the Spessart, defeated the Hessians at Laufach/Frohnhofen on 13 July and the Austrian and Hessian troops at Aschaffenburg on 14 July. The Federal troops had to withdraw westward to the left bank of the Main. After the Prussians had conquered Aschaffenburg and crossed the Main the way to Frankfurt and Darmstadt was open. Now the VIIIth Corps abandoned Frankfurt, moved south across the Odenwald and then turned eastward to meet the Bavarians at the River Tauber. The Prussians occupied the now undefended Frankfurt on 16 July and then followed the VIIIth Corps along the left bank of the Main. In the combat of Hundheim (23 July), the battles of Werbach, Tauberbischofsheim (both 24 July) and Gerchsheim (25 July) the VIIIth Corps was defeated by the Prussians. At 25 July the Prussians also clashed with the Bavarians again at Helmstadt and the following day at Roßbrunn. These battles were also won by the Prussians. The allied troops retreated to Würzburg. The Prussians followed and began to bombard the Marienberg Fortress in Würzburg on 26 July. But soon a truce was negotiated after the news had reached the Bavarian headquarters, that the Prussians and the Austrians had signed their Armistice of Nikolsburg at the same day. At last Würzburg was occupied by the Prussians.

In a separate operation the 2nd Prussian reserve corps marched into Bavaria at the north-east on 23 July and occupied Hof, Bayreuth (28 July) and at last Nuremberg (31 July).

== Reasons for the Prussian victory ==
The Prussian victory is more the result of better organization than a supposed technical superiority of the Prussian weapons like the needle gun (Zündnadelgewehr), both Prussian and Bavarian reports stating that the Podelwils rifled-musket was not any worst. Helmut von Moltke, the chief of the Prussian general staff, had planned an offensive war to beat the federal troops before they could unite and fully use their superiority in men and equipment. The plan was successful because the untrained federal armies needed a long time for mobilization which the Prussians had prepared well. Furthermore the Prussians had one unified command which the federal side had not. Formally Prince Karl Theodor of Bavaria, the commander of the VIIth corps, was supreme commander of all the federal troops, but Prince Alexander of Hesse and by Rhine, the chief of the VIIIth corps, also received orders from the Federal Convention (Bundestag) in Frankfurt and the governments of the states which had sent troops. The communication between the federal troops was as insufficient as their reconnaissance so that they often had to react instead of acting initiatively. However, the main federal participant of the war, Bavaria, managed to halt the prussian several times, but were unmotivated and directionless. Had the soldiers and commanders had been more motivated, it is possible that the course of the campaign could have gone very differently.

== Consequences ==
The German Confederation was abolished. Prussia annexed Hannover, Nassau, Hesse-Kassel and Frankfurt and small parts of Hesse-Darmstadt and Bavaria. Bavaria, Württemberg, Baden and Hesse-Darmstadt remained independent, but had to sign military alliances with Prussia. In Bavaria a fundamental army reform followed in 1868.
