= Battle of Königgrätz order of battle =

The following units and commanders took part in the Battle of Königgrätz on July 3, 1866. Compiled from the Prussian Army's Official History of the war.

== Ranks and translations ==
Prussian Army Royal Saxon Army	Austrian Army
Generalfeldmarschall (Field Marshal)	Feldmarschall (Field Marshal)
General der Infanterie (General of Infantry); General der Kavallerie (General of Cavalry)	Feldzeugmeister; General der Kavallerie (Cavalry General)
Generalleutnant (Lieutenant General)	Feldmarschallleutnant (Lieutenant Field Marshal)
Generalmajor (Major General)	General-Major (Major General)

== Prussian Armies ==
King William I of Prussia
General der Infanterie Helmuth von Moltke

=== First Army ===
General der Kavallerie Prince Friedrich Karl of Prussia
Chief of Staff: Generalleutnant Konstantin Bernhard von Voigts-Rhetz

==== III Corps ====
General der Kavallerie Prince Friedrich Karl of Prussia

Division	Brigade	Regiments and Others
5th Division; Generalleutnant Wilhelm von Tümpling	9th Brigade	8th Infantry Regiment; 48th Infantry Regiment
5th Division; Generalleutnant Wilhelm von Tümpling	10th Brigade	12th Infantry Regiment; 18th Infantry Regiment
5th Division; Generalleutnant Wilhelm von Tümpling	Divisional troops	3rd Uhlan Regiment (Note: The 3rd Uhlans and 2nd Dragoons were detached to form a temporary Cavalry Brigade during the battle.); 3rd Pioneer Battalion; I Battalion, 3rd Field Artillery Regiment
6th Division; Generalleutnant Albrecht Gustav von Manstein (Note: During the battle, the 5th and 6th Divisions formed the First Army's reserve and were grouped together under Manstein's command. Some sources refer to this temporary group as the III Corps, after the peacetime command that both divisions were assigned to.)	11th Brigade	35th Infantry Regiment; 60th Infantry Regiment
6th Division; Generalleutnant Albrecht Gustav von Manstein	12th Brigade	24th Infantry Regiment; 64th Infantry Regiment
6th Division; Generalleutnant Albrecht Gustav von Manstein	Divisional troops	2nd Dragoon Regiment; 3rd Jäger Battalion; III Battalion, 3rd Field Artillery Regiment

==== IV Corps ====
Division	Brigade	Regiments and Others
7th Division; Generalleutnant Eduard von Fransecky	13th Brigade	26th Infantry Regiment; 66th Infantry Regiment
7th Division; Generalleutnant Eduard von Fransecky	14th Brigade	27th Infantry Regiment; 67th Infantry Regiment
7th Division; Generalleutnant Eduard von Fransecky	Divisional troops	10th Hussar Regiment; 4th Pioneer Battalion; I Battalion, 4th Field Artillery Regiment
8th Division; Generalleutnant Heinrich Friedrich von Horn	15th Brigade	31st Infantry Regiment; 71st Infantry Regiment
8th Division; Generalleutnant Heinrich Friedrich von Horn	16th Brigade	72nd Infantry Regiment
8th Division; Generalleutnant Heinrich Friedrich von Horn	Divisional troops	6th Uhlan Regiment; 4th Jäger Battalion; III Battalion, 4th Field Artillery Regiment
Army troops	Artillery Reserve	3rd Field Artillery Regiment; II Battalion; Horse Artillery Battalion; 4th Field Artillery Regiment; II Battalion; Horse Artillery Battalion

==== II Corps ====
Generalleutnant Stephan von Schmidt

Division	Brigade	Regiments and Others
3rd Division; Generalleutnant August von Werder	5th Brigade	2nd Infantry Regiment; 42nd Infantry Regiment
3rd Division; Generalleutnant August von Werder	6th Brigade	14th Infantry Regiment; 54th Infantry Regiment
3rd Division; Generalleutnant August von Werder	Divisional troops	5th Hussar Regiment; 2nd Jaeger Battalion; 2nd Pioneer Battalion; I Battalion, 2nd Field Artillery Regiment
4th Division; Generalleutnant Friedrich Herwarth von Bittenfeld	7th Brigade	9th Infantry Regiment; 49th Infantry Regiment
4th Division; Generalleutnant Friedrich Herwarth von Bittenfeld	8th Brigade	21st Infantry Regiment; 61st Infantry Regiment
4th Division; Generalleutnant Friedrich Herwarth von Bittenfeld	Artillery	4th Uhlan Regiment; III Battalion, 2nd Field Artillery Regiment
Corps troops	3rd Heavy Cavalry Brigade	2nd Cuirassier Regiment; 9th Uhlan Regiment; 2nd Horse Artillery Battery, 2nd Field Artillery Regiment
Corps troops	Artillery Reserve	II Battalion, 2nd Field Artillery Regiment

==== Cavalry Corps ====
General der Kavallerie Prince Albert of Prussia

Division	Brigade	Regiments and Others
1st Cavalry Division; Generalmajor Hermann von Alvensleben	2nd Heavy Cavalry Brigade	6th Cuirassier Regiment; 7th Cuirassier Regiment; 1st Horse Artillery Battery, Guards Artillery Regiment
1st Cavalry Division; Generalmajor Hermann von Alvensleben	1st Light Cavalry Brigade	1st Guards Dragoon Regiment; 1st Guards Uhlan Regiment; 2nd Guards Uhlan Regiment; 2nd Horse Artillery Battery, Guards Artillery Regiment
2nd Cavalry Division; Generalmajor Benno Hann von Weyhern	2nd Light Cavalry Brigade	2nd Guards Dragoons Regiment; 3rd Hussar Regiment; 11th Uhlan Regiment; 1st Horse Artillery Battery, 2nd Field Artillery Regiment
2nd Cavalry Division; Generalmajor Benno Hann von Weyhern	3rd Light Cavalry Brigade	3rd Dragoon Regiment; 12th Hussar Regiment; 3rd Horse Artillery Battery, 2nd Field Artillery Regiment
Corps Troops	Artillery	4th Horse Artillery Battery, Guards Artillery Regiment

=== Second Army ===
General der Infanterie Crown Prince Frederick William of Prussia
Chief of Staff: Generalmajor Leonhard Graf von Blumenthal

Division	Brigade	Regiments and Others
Reserve Cavalry of the Second Army; Generalmajor Julius von Hartmann	Heavy Cavalry Brigade	1st Cuirassier Regiment; 5th Cuirassier Regiment
Reserve Cavalry of the Second Army; Generalmajor Julius von Hartmann	Light Cavalry Brigade	2nd Hussar Regiment; 10th Uhlan Regiment
Reserve Cavalry of the Second Army; Generalmajor Julius von Hartmann	Landwehr Cavalry Brigade	2nd Landwehr Hussar Regiment; 1st Landwehr Uhlan Regiment
Reserve Cavalry of the Second Army; Generalmajor Julius von Hartmann	Artillery	2nd Horse Artillery Battery, 6th Field Artillery Regiment; 3rd Horse Artillery Battery, 5th Field Artillery Regiment

==== Guard Corps ====
General der Kavallerie Prince August of Württemberg

Division	Brigade	Regiments and Others
1st Guards Division; Generalleutnant Wilhelm Hiller von Gärtringen	1st Guards Brigade	1st Guards Regiment; 3rd Guards Regiment
1st Guards Division; Generalleutnant Wilhelm Hiller von Gärtringen	2nd Guards Brigade	2nd Guards Regiment; Guards Fusilier Regiment
1st Guards Division; Generalleutnant Wilhelm Hiller von Gärtringen	Divisional troops	Guards Hussar Regiment; Guards Jäger Battalion; I Battalion, Guards Artillery Regiment
2nd Guards Division; Generalleutnant Heinrich von Plonski	3rd Guards Brigade	1st Grenadiers Regiment; 3rd Grenadiers Regiment
2nd Guards Division; Generalleutnant Heinrich von Plonski	4th Guards Brigade	2nd Grenadiers Regiment; 4th Grenadiers Regiment
2nd Guards Division; Generalleutnant Heinrich von Plonski	Divisional troops	3rd Guards Uhlan Regiment; Guards Rifles Battalion; III Battalion, Guards Artillery Regiment
Corps troops	1st Heavy Cavalry Brigade	Garde du Corps; Guards Cuirassier Regiment; 3rd Horse Artillery Battery, Guards Artillery Regiment
Corps troops	Artillery	II Battalion, Guards Artillery Regiment; 4th Horse Artillery Battery, Guards Artillery Regiment

==== I Corps ====
General der Infanterie Adolf von Bonin

Division	Brigade	Regiments and Others
1st Division; Generalleutnant von Grossmann	1st Brigade	1st Infantry Regiment; 41st Infantry Regiment
1st Division; Generalleutnant von Grossmann	2nd Brigade	3rd Infantry Regiment; 43rd Infantry Regiment
1st Division; Generalleutnant von Grossmann	Divisional troops	1st Dragoon Regiment; 1st Jäger Battalion; I Battalion, 1st Field Artillery Regiment
2nd Division; Generalleutnant Karl Friedrich Wilhelm von Clausewitz	3rd Brigade	4th Infantry Regiment; 44th Infantry Regiment
2nd Division; Generalleutnant Karl Friedrich Wilhelm von Clausewitz	4th Brigade	5th Infantry Regiment; 45th Infantry Regiment
2nd Division; Generalleutnant Karl Friedrich Wilhelm von Clausewitz	Divisional troops	1st Hussar Regiment; 1st Pioneer Battalion; III Battalion, 1st Field Artillery Regiment
Corps troops	Cavalry Brigade	3rd Cuirassier Regiment; 8th Uhlan Regiment; 12th Uhlan Regiment; 3rd Horse Artillery Battery, 1st Field Artillery Regiment
Corps troops	Artillery Reserve	Horse Artillery Battalion, 1st Field Artillery Regiment; II Battalion, 1st Field Artillery Regiment

==== V Corps ====
General der Infanterie Karl Friedrich von Steinmetz

Division	Brigade	Regiments and Others
9th Division; Generalmajor Julius Ludwig von Loewenfeld	17th Brigade	18th Infantry Regiment; 58th Infantry Regiment
9th Division; Generalmajor Julius Ludwig von Loewenfeld	18th Brigade	7th Infantry Regiment; 5th Jäger Battalion
9th Division; Generalmajor Julius Ludwig von Loewenfeld	Divisional troops	1st Uhlan Regiment (Note: The 1st and 4th Uhlans were detached to form a temporary Cavalry Brigade under V Corps during the battle.); I Battalion, 5th Artillery Regiment
10th Division; Generalmajor Hugo von Kirchbach	19th Brigade	6th Infantry Regiment; 46th Infantry Regiment
10th Division; Generalmajor Hugo von Kirchbach	20th Brigade	7th Infantry Regiment; 47th Infantry Regiment
10th Division; Generalmajor Hugo von Kirchbach	Divisional troops	4th Uhlan Regiment; III Battalion, 5th Artillery Regiment
Corps troops	Artillery Reserve	5th Artillery Regiment; II Battalion; Horse Artillery Battalion

==== VI Corps ====
General der Kavallerie Louis von Mutius

Division	Brigade	Regiments and Others
11th Division; Generalleutnant Heinrich von Zastrow	21st Brigade	10th Infantry Regiment; 50th Infantry Regiment
11th Division; Generalleutnant Heinrich von Zastrow	22nd Brigade	38th Infantry Regiment; 51st Infantry Regiment
11th Division; Generalleutnant Heinrich von Zastrow	Division troops	8th Dragoon Regiment (Note: The 8th Dragoons were detached to form a temporary Cavalry Brigade with the 4th Hussars during the battle.); Silesian Pioneer Battalion; II Battalion, 6th Artillery Regiment
12th Division; Generalleutnant Ferdinand von Prondzynski	Combined Brigade	22nd Infantry Regiment; 23rd Infantry Regiment
12th Division; Generalleutnant Ferdinand von Prondzynski	Division troops	6th Hussar Regiment; 6th Jäger Battalion; 1st and 5th Batteries, I Battalion 6th Artillery Regiment
Corps troops	Cavalry	4th Hussar Regiment
Corps troops	Artillery Reserve	6th Artillery Regiment; I Battalion; Horse Artillery Battalion

=== Elbe Army ===
General der Infanterie Karl Eberhard Herwarth von Bittenfeld (Note: The Elbe Army was in effect the VIII Corps reinforced by the 14th Division. Bittenfeld was simultaneously commander of the Army and VIII Corps)
Chief of Staff: Colonel Ludwig von Schlotheim

Division	Brigade	Regiments and Others
14th Division; Generalleutnant Hugo Eberhard zu Münster-Meinhövel	27th Brigade	16th Infantry Regiment; 56th Infantry Regiment
14th Division; Generalleutnant Hugo Eberhard zu Münster-Meinhövel	28th Brigade	17th Infantry Regiment; 57th Infantry Regiment
14th Division; Generalleutnant Hugo Eberhard zu Münster-Meinhövel	Divisional troops	7th Dragoons Regiment; 7th Jäger Battalion; III Battalion, 7th Field Artillery Regiment
15th Division; Generalleutnant Philipp Carl von Canstein	29th Brigade	25th Infantry Regiment; 65th Infantry Regiment
15th Division; Generalleutnant Philipp Carl von Canstein	30th Brigade	28th Infantry Regiment; 68th Infantry Regiment
15th Division; Generalleutnant Philipp Carl von Canstein	Divisional troops	7th Hussars Regiment; III Battalion, 8th Field Artillery Regiment
16th Division; Generalleutnant Friedrich August von Etzel	31st Brigade	29th Infantry Regiment; 69th Infantry Regiment
16th Division; Generalleutnant Friedrich August von Etzel	Fusilier Brigade	33rd Fusilier Regiment; 34th Fusilier Regiment
16th Division; Generalleutnant Friedrich August von Etzel	Divisional troops	8th Jäger Battalion; 1st Horse Artillery Battery, 8th Field Artillery Regiment; 2 Field Artillery Batteries, 8th Field Artillery Regiment
Army troops	14th Cavalry Brigade	5th Uhlan Regiment; 11th Hussar Regiment
Army troops	Reserve Cavalry Brigade	7th Hussar Regiment; 8th Cuirassier Regiment; Pomeranian Landwehr Reiter Regiment
Army troops	Artillery Reserve	7th Artillery Regiment; II Battalion; 1st and 2nd Horse Artillery Batteries; 8th Artillery Regiment; II Battalion; 2nd and 4th Horse Artillery Batteries

==== I Reserve Corps ====
Generalleutnant Gustav von der Mülbe (Note: The Reserve Corps did not take part in the battle. The leading element of the Corps, the Landwehr Guards Division, did not arrive until the evening following.)

Division	Brigade	Regiments and Others
Landwehr Guards Division	1st Landwehr Guards Brigade	1st Landwehr Guards Regiment; 2nd Landwehr Guards Regiment
Landwehr Guards Division	2nd Landwehr Guards Brigade	1st Landwehr Grenadier Regiment; 2nd Landwehr Grenadier Regiment
Combined Landwehr Division	1st Landwehr Brigade	9th Landwehr Regiment; 21st Landwehr Regiment
Combined Landwehr Division	2nd Landwehr Brigade	13th Landwehr Regiment; 15th Landwehr Regiment
Landwehr Cavalry Division		Six Landwehr Cavalry Regiments

== Austrian North Army ==
Feldzeugmeister Ludwig von Benedek
Chief of Staff: Feldmarschall-Leutnant Alfred von Henikstein

Brigade	Regiments and Others
Army Artillery Reserve	VI Artillery Regiment; XI Artillery Regiment; XII Artillery Regiment; Total: Sixteen Artillery batteries

=== 1st Corps ===
General der Kavallerie Eduard Clam-Gallas
Deputy: General-Major Leopold Gondrecourt

Brigade	Regiments and Others
Brigade Poschacher	30th Infantry Regiment (East Galicia) (Note: The primary recruiting district of Austrian Infantry Regiments is shown in brackets.); 34th Infantry Regiment (Hungary); 18th Feldjäger Battalion; 5th Foot Artillery Battery, I Artillery Regiment
Brigade Leiningen	33rd Infantry Regiment (Hungary); 38th Infantry Regiment (Venetia); 32nd Feldjäger Battalion; 4th Foot Artillery Battery, I Artillery Regiment
Brigade Piret	18th Infantry Regiment (Bohemia); 45th Infantry Regiment (Venetia); 29th Feldjäger Battalion; 6th Foot Artillery Battery, I Artillery Regiment
Brigade Ringelsheim	42nd Infantry Regiment (Bohemia); 73rd Infantry Regiment (Bohemia); 26th Feldjäger Battalion; 2nd Foot Artillery Battery, I Artillery Regiment
Brigade Kalik (Note: Attached from the 3rd Corps)	35th Infantry Regiment (Bohemia); 72nd Infantry Regiment (Hungary); 22nd Feldjäger Battalion; Foot Artillery Battery
Artillery	I Artillery Regiment; Two 4-pounder batteries; Two 8-pounder batteries; One rocket battery
Cavalry	2nd Hussars Regiment, four squadrons

=== 2nd Corps ===
Feldmarschall-Leutnant Karl von Thun und Hohenstein
Deputy: General-Major Josip Filipović

Brigade	Regiments and Others
Brigade Thom	40th Infantry Regiment (West Galicia); 69th Infantry Regiment (Hungary); 2nd Feldjäger Battalion; 1st Foot Artillery Battery, II Artillery Regiment
Brigade Henriquez	14th Infantry Regiment (Upper Austria); 27th Infantry Regiment (Styria); 9th Feldjäger Battalion; 2nd Foot Artillery Battery, II Artillery Regiment
Brigade Saffram	64th Infantry Regiment (Siebenbürgen); 80th Infantry Regiment (Venetia); 11th Feldjäger Battalion; 3rd Foot Artillery Battery, II Artillery Regiment
Brigade Wurttemberg	47th Infantry Regiment (Styria); 57th Infantry Regiment (West Galicia); 20th Feldjäger Battalion; 4th Foot Artillery Battery, II Artillery Regiment
Artillery	II Artillery Regiment; Two 4-pounder batteries; Two 8-pounder batteries; One rocket battery
Cavalry	6th Uhlan Regiment, four squadrons

=== 3rd Corps ===
Feldmarschall-Leutnant Archduke Ernest
Deputy: General-Major Alois von Baumgarten

Brigade	Regiments and Others
Brigade Appiano	46th Infantry Regiment (Hungary); 62nd Infantry Regiment (Siebenbürgen); 4th Feldjäger Battalion; 3rd Foot Artillery Battery, VIII Artillery Regiment
Brigade Benedek	52nd Infantry Regiment (Hungary); 78th Infantry Regiment (Croatia/Slavonia); 1st Feldjäger Battalion; 4th Foot Artillery Battery, VIII Artillery Regiment
Brigade Kirschberg	44th Infantry Regiment (Hungary); 49th Infantry Regiment (Lower Austria); 3rd Feldjäger Battalion; 5th Foot Artillery Battery, VIII Artillery Regiment
Brigade Prochaska	13th Grenzer Regiment; 4th Battalion, 55th Infantry Regiment (East Galicia); 4th Battalion, 56th Infantry Regiment (West Galicia); 33rd and 34th Feldjäger Battalions (combined battalion); 6th Foot Artillery Battery, III Artillery Regiment
Artillery	VIII Artillery Regiment; Two 4-pounder batteries; Two 8-pounder batteries; One rocket battery
Cavalry	9th Uhlan regiment, two squadrons

=== 4th Corps ===
Feldmarschall-Leutnant Tassilo Festetics de Tolna
Deputy: Feldmarschall-Leutnant Anton Mollinary von Monte Pastello

Brigade	Regiments and Others
Brigade Brandernstein	12th Infantry Regiment (Hungary); 26th Infantry Regiment (Venetia); 27th Feldjäger Battalion; 1st Foot Artillery Battery, IV Artillery Regiment
Brigade Fleishhacker	6th Infantry Regiment (Banat); 61st Infantry Regiment (Banat); 13th Feldjäger Battalion; 2nd Foot Artillery Battery, IV Artillery Regiment
Brigade Peockh	37th Infantry Regiment (Hungary); 51st Infantry Regiment (Siebenbürgen); 8th Feldjäger Battalion; 3rd Foot Artillery Battery, IV Artillery Regiment
Brigade Archduke Joseph	67th Infantry Regiment (Hungary); 68th Infantry Regiment (Hungary); 30th Feldjäger Battalion; 4th Foot Artillery Battery, IV Artillery Regiment
Artillery	IV Artillery Regiment; Two 4-pounder batteries; Two 8-pounder batteries; One rocket battery
Cavalry	7th Hussars Regiment, four squadrons

=== 6th Corps ===
Feldmarschall-Leutnant Wilhelm von Ramming
Deputy: General-Major August Kochmeister

Brigade	Regiments and Others
Brigade Waldstaetten	9th Infantry Regiment (East Galicia); 79th Infantry Regiment (Venetia); 6th Feldjäger Battalion; 1st Foot Artillery Battery, X Artillery Regiment
Brigade Hertwegh	41st Infantry Regiment (Bukovina); 56th Infantry Regiment (West Galicia); 25th Feldjäger Battalion; 2nd Foot Artillery Battery, X Artillery Regiment
Brigade Rosenweig	4th Infantry Regiment (Lower Austria); 55th Infantry Regiment (East Galicia); 17th Feldjäger Battalion; 3rd Foot Artillery Battery, X Artillery Regiment
Brigade Jonak	20th Infantry Regiment (West Galicia); 60th Infantry Regiment (Hungary); 14th Feldjäger Battalion; 4th Foot Artillery Battery, X Artillery Regiment
Artillery	X Artillery Regiment; One 4-pounder battery; Two 8-pounder batteries; Two Horse Artillery batteries; One rocket battery
Cavalry	10th Uhlan Regiment, four squadrons

=== 8th Corps ===
Feldmarschall-Leutnant Archduke Leopold Ludwig
Deputy: General-Major Joseph Weber

Brigade	Regiments and Others
Brigade Fragnern	15th Infantry Regiment (East Galicia); 77th Infantry Regiment (East Galicia); 5th Feldjäger Battalion; 1st Foot Artillery Battery, IX Artillery Regiment
Brigade Kreyssern	8th Infantry Regiment (Moravia); 74th Infantry Regiment (Bohemia); 31st Feldjäger Battalion; 4th Foot Artillery Battery, IX Artillery Regiment
Brigade Rothkirch	25th Infantry Regiment (Hungary); 71st Infantry Regiment (Hungary); 3rd Foot Artillery Battery, IX Artillery Regiment
Brigade Roth	21st Infantry Regiment (Bohemia); 32nd Infantry Regiment (Hungary); 24th Feldjäger Battalion; 2nd Foot Artillery Battery, IX Artillery Regiment
Artillery	IX Artillery Regiment; One 4-pounder battery; Two 8-pounder batteries; Two Horse Artillery batteries; One rocket battery
Cavalry	3rd Uhlan Regiment, five squadrons

=== 10th Corps ===
Feldmarschall-Leutnant Ludwig von Gablenz
Deputy: General-Major Alexander Freiherr von Koller

Brigade	Regiments and Others
Brigade Mondel	10th Infantry Regiment (East Galicia); 24th Infantry Regiment (East Galicia); 12th Feldjäger Battalion; 1st Foot Artillery Battery, III Artillery Regiment
Brigade Grivicics	2nd Infantry Regiment (Siebenbürgen); 23rd Infantry Regiment (Banat); 16th Feldjäger Battalion; 2nd Foot Artillery Battery, III Artillery Regiment
Brigade Knebel	1st Infantry Regiment (Moravia/Silesia); 3rd Infantry Regiment (Moravia); 28th Feldjäger Battalion; 3rd Foot Artillery Battery, III Artillery Regiment
Brigade Wimpffen	13th Infantry Regiment (Venetia); 58th Infantry Regiment (East Galicia); 4th Foot Artillery Battery, III Artillery Regiment
Artillery	III Artillery Regiment; One 4-pounder batteries; Two 8-pounder batteries; One rocket battery
Cavalry	9th Uhlan Regiment, three squadrons

=== Reserve Cavalry ===
Division	Brigade	Regiments and Others
1st Light Cavalry Division; General-Major Leopold von Edelsheim-Gyulai	Brigade Appel	2nd Dragoon Regiment; 9th Hussar Regiment; 4th Horse Artillery Battery, XI Artillery Regiment
1st Light Cavalry Division; General-Major Leopold von Edelsheim-Gyulai	Brigade Wallis	1st Dragoon Regiment; 10th Hussar Regiment; 5th Horse Artillery Battery, XI Artillery Regiment
1st Light Cavalry Division; General-Major Leopold von Edelsheim-Gyulai	Brigade Fratricevies	5th Hussar Regiment; 8th Hussar Regiment; 6th Horse Artillery Battery, XI Artillery Regiment
2nd Light Cavalry Division; General-Major Emmerich von Thurn und Taxis	Brigade Bellegarde	4th Hussar Regiment; 12th Hussar Regiment; 2nd Horse Artillery Battery, XI Artillery Regiment
2nd Light Cavalry Division; General-Major Emmerich von Thurn und Taxis	Brigade Westphalen	6th Hussar Regiment; 14th Hussar Regiment; 3rd Horse Artillery Battery, XI Artillery Regiment
1st Reserve (Heavy) Cavalry Division; Feldmarschall-Leutnant Wilhelm zu Schleswig-Holstein-Glücksburg	Brigade Solms	4th Cuirassier Regiment; 6th Cuirassier Regiment; 8th Uhlan Regiment; 5th Horse Artillery Battery, VI Artillery Regiment
1st Reserve (Heavy) Cavalry Division; Feldmarschall-Leutnant Wilhelm zu Schleswig-Holstein-Glücksburg	Brigade Schindloecker	9th Cuirassier Regiment; 11th Cuirassier Regiment; 7th Uhlan Regiment; 6th Horse Artillery Battery, XI Artillery Regiment
2nd Reserve (Heavy) Cavalry Division; General Carl von Egbell	Brigade Boxberg	3rd Cuirassier Regiment; 7th Cuirassier Regiment; 2nd Uhlan Regiment; 4th Horse Artillery Battery, XII Artillery Regiment
2nd Reserve (Heavy) Cavalry Division; General Carl von Egbell	Brigade Soltyk	1st Cuirassier Regiment; 5th Cuirassier Regiment; 5th Uhlan Regiment; 5th Horse Artillery Battery, XII Artillery Regiment
3rd Reserve (Heavy) Cavalry Division; General-Major Karl von Coudenhove	Brigade Windischgraetz	2nd Cuirassier Regiment; 8th Cuirassier Regiment; 7th Uhlan Regiment; 2nd Horse Artillery Battery, XII Artillery Regiment
3rd Reserve (Heavy) Cavalry Division; General-Major Karl von Coudenhove	Brigade Mengen	10th Cuirassier Regiment; 12th Cuirassier Regiment; 11th Uhlan Regiment; 3rd Horse Artillery Battery, XII Artillery Regiment

=== Saxon Army ===
General der Infanterie Crown Prince Albert of Saxony

Division	Brigade	Regiments and Others
1st Division; Generalleutnant Bernhard von Schimpff	2nd Brigade	5th Infantry Battalion; 6th Infantry Battalion; 7th Infantry Battalion; 8th Infantry Battalion; 2nd Jaeger Battalion
1st Division; Generalleutnant Bernhard von Schimpff	3rd Brigade	9th Infantry Battalion; 10th Infantry Battalion; 11th Infantry Battalion; 12th Infantry Battalion; 3rd Jaeger Battalion
1st Division; Generalleutnant Bernhard von Schimpff	Divisional troops	4th Squadron, 2nd Cavalry Regiment; 4th Squadron, 3rd Cavalry Regiment; 12-pounder Artillery battery; 6-pounder Artillery battery
2nd Division; Generalleutnant Thuisko von Stieglitz	1st Brigade	1st Infantry Battalion; 2nd Infantry Battalion; 3rd Infantry Battalion; 4th Infantry Battalion; 1st Jaeger Battalion
2nd Division; Generalleutnant Thuisko von Stieglitz	4th (Leib) Brigade	13th Infantry Battalion; 14th Infantry Battalion; 15th Infantry Battalion; 16th Infantry Battalion; 4th Jaeger Battalion
2nd Division; Generalleutnant Thuisko von Stieglitz	Divisional troops	4th Squadron, Guard Cavalry Regiment; 4th Squadron, 1st Cavalry Regiment; 12-pounder Artillery battery; 6-pounder Artillery battery
Cavalry Division; Generalleutnant Bernhard von Fritsch	1st Brigade	Guard Cavalry Regiment; 1st Cavalry Regiment
Cavalry Division; Generalleutnant Bernhard von Fritsch	2nd Brigade	2nd Cavalry Regiment; 3rd Cavalry Regiment
Cavalry Division; Generalleutnant Bernhard von Fritsch	Divisional troops	12-pounder Horse Artillery battery
Army Troops	Artillery Reserve	I Artillery Brigade; Two 12-pounder batteries, 6-pounder battery; II Artillery Brigade; 12-pounder battery, 6-pounder battery
Army Troops	Pioneers	2 Pioneer Companies; Pontoon Detachment
