= Second Army (Austro-Prussian War) =

Military unit

The Second Army was a formation of the Prussian Army during the Austro-Prussian War. Being a wartime formation, afterwards the field army was demobilized.

== Formation ==
For the Austro-Prussian War Helmuth von Moltke, the Chief of the Prussian General Staff, formed three field armies (First Army, Second Army and the Army of the Elbe) for the war in the east as well as the Army of the Main for the campaigns in the west. Command of the Second Army was given to Crown Prince Frederick William of Prussia, with Generalmajor Leonhard Graf von Blumenthal as Chief of Staff and Oberst Albrecht von Stosch as Oberquartiermeister.

== Order of Battle ==
The Second Army had the following order of battle:

Commanding General: Crown Prince Frederick William of Prussia

Chief of Staff: Generalmajor Leonhard von Blumenthal

Quartermaster General: Generalmajor Albrecht von Stosch

Chief of Artillery: Generalmajor Georg Albano von Jacobi

Chief of Engineers: Generalmajor Heinrich von Schweinitz

=== I Corps ===
Commanding General: Generalleutnant Adolf von Bonin
Chief of Staff: Oberstleutnant August von Borries

Commander of Artillery: Oberst Hermann Robert Knothe

Commander of Engineers: Oberst Weber

1st Division (Generalleutnant Georg Friedrich von Großmann)

- 1. Brigade: Generalmajor Alexander von Pape
  - Grenadier-Regiment Nr. 1 (1. Ostpreußisches) Nr. 1
  - Infanterie-Regiment (5. Ostpreußisches) Nr. 41 : Oberst Hermann von Koblinski
- 2. Brigade: Generalmajor Albert von Barnekow
  - BarnekowInfanterie-Regiment Nr. 3
  - Infanterie-Regiment Nr. 43: Oberst Heinrich von Tresckow
  - Lithauisches Dragoner-Regiment Nr.1

2nd Division (Generalleutnant Friedrich von Clausewitz)

- 3. Brigade: Generalmajor August Malotki von Trzebiatowski
  - Infanterie-Regiment Nr. 4
  - Infanterie-Regiment Nr. 44
- 4. Brigade: Generalmajor Baron Gustav von Buddenbrock
  - Infanterie-Regiment Nr. 5
  - Infanterie-Regiment Nr. 45
  - Leibhusaren-Regiment Nr. 1
  - Ostpreußisches Jäger-Bataillon Nr. 1
- 2. Kavallerie-Brigade: Oberst Adalbert von Bredow
  - Ostpreußisches Kürassier-Regiment Nr. 3
  - Ostpreußisches Ulanen-Regiment Nr. 8
  - Lithauisches Ulanen-Regiment Nr. 12

=== V Corps ===
Commanding General: General Karl Friedrich von Steinmetz
Chief of Staff: Oberst Ludwig von Wittich

Commander of Artillery: Oberst Karl von Kraewel

Commander of Engineers: Oberst Franz von Kleist

9th Division (Generalmajor Julius Ludwig von Loewenfeld)

- 17. Brigade: Generalmajor Karl Rudolf von Ollech
  - Westphälisches Füsilier-Regiment Nr. 37, Oberst von Below
  - 3. Posensches Infanterie-Regiment Nr. 58, Oberst Bruno von François
- 18. Brigade: Generalmajor Adolf von Horn
  - Königs-Grenadier-Regiment (2. Westpreußisches) Nr. 7, Oberst von Voigts-Rhetz

10th Division (Generalleutnant Hugo von Kirchbach)

- 19. Brigade: Generalmajor Otto von Tiedemann
  - 1. Westpreußisches Grenadier-Regiment Nr. 6, Oberstleutnant Karl von Scheffler
  - 1. Niederschlesischen Infanterie-Regiment Nr. 46, Oberst Walther von Monbary
- 20. Brigade: Generalmajor Theodor Rudolf August Wittich
  - 2. Niederschlesischen Infanterie-Regiment Nr. 47, Oberst von Massow
  - 6. Brandenburgisches Infanterie-Regiment Nr. 52, Oberst Karl von Blumenthal
- 2. Kavallerie-Brigade: Oberst Adalbert von Bredow
  - Ostpreußisches Kürassier-Regiment Nr. 3
  - Ostpreußisches Ulanen-Regiment Nr. 8
  - Lithauisches Ulanen-Regiment Nr. 12

Combined Cavalry Brigade Major General Karl Georg Heinrich von Wnuck

- Westpreußischen Ulanen-Regiment Nr. 1, Oberst von Tresckow
- 1. Schlesisches Dragoner-Regiment Nr. 4, Major von Mayer
- Niederschlesisches Feld-Artillerie-Regiments Nr. 5, Oberstleutnant Elten
- 5. Jäger Bataillon
- 2. Schlesische Dragoner-Regiment Nr. 8, Oberstleutnant von Wichmann

=== VI Corps ===
Commanding General: General Louis von Mutius
Chief of Staff: Oberst Oskar von Sperling

Commander of Artillery: Generalmajor Friedrich Wilhelm Eduard Herkt

Commander of Engineers: Oberst Schulz

11th Division (Generalleutnant Heinrich von Zastrow)

- 21. Brigade: Generalmajor Louis von Hanenfeldt
  - 1. Schlesisches Grenadier-Regiment Nr. 10, Oberst Freiherr von Falkenstein
  - 3. Niederschlesisches Infanterie-Regiment Nr. 50, Oberst von Natzmer
- 22. Brigade: Generalmajor Otto von Hoffmann
  - 4. Niederschlesisches Infanterie-Regiment Nr. 51, Oberst Paris
  - Schlesisches Füsilier-Regiment Nr. 38, Oberst von Witzleben
  - 2. Schlesisches Dragoner-Regiment Nr. 8, Oberstleutnant von Wichmann
  - 2. Fuß-Abteilung Schlesischen Feldartillerie-Regiments Nr. 6, Major Bröcker
  - Schlesisches Pionier-Bataillon, Oberstleutnant Dieterichf

12th Division (Generalleutnant Hugo von Kirchbach)

- 1. Kombinierte Brigade: Generalmajor Karl von Cranach
  - 1. Oberschlesisches Infanterie-Regiment Nr. 22, Oberst Amand von Ruville
  - 2. Oberschlesisches Infanterie-Regiment Nr. 23, Oberst Oskar Stein von Kaminski
- 2. Kombinierte Brigade: Generalmajor von Knobelsdorff
  - 3. Oberschlesisches Infanterie-Regiment Nr. 62, Oberst von Malachowski
  - 4. Oberschlesisches Infanterie-Regiment Nr. 63, Oberstleutnant von Eckartsberg
  - 2. Schlesisches Husaren Regiment Nr. 6, Oberst von Trotha
  - Schlesisches Kürassier-Regiment Nr. 1, Oberst von Barby
  - Schlesisches Ulanen-Regiment Nr. 2, Oberst August von Baumgarth
  - Schlesisches Jäger-Bataillon Nr. 6, Oberstleutnant Graf zu Dohna
  - 1. Fuß-Abteilung Schlesischen Feld Artillerie-Regiments, Major Forst
  - Kavallerie: 1. Schlesisches Husaren-Regiment Nr. 4, Oberstleutnant von Buddenbrock
  - Reserve-Artillerie: 5 batteries, Oberst Otto von Scherbening

=== Guards Corps ===
Commanding General: Prince August of Württemberg
Chief of Staff: Oberst Friedrich Franz von Dannenberg

Commander of Artillery: Generalmajor Louis von Colomier

Commander of Engineers: Oberst Biehler

1st Guards Infantry Division

- 1. Garde-Infanterie-Brigade: Oberst Hugo von Obernitz
- 2. Garde-Infanterie-Brigade: Generalmajor Konstantin von Alvensleben

2nd Guards Infantry Division

- 3. Garde-Infanterie-Brigade: Generalmajor Rudolph Otto von Budritzki
  - Garde-Grenadier-Regiment Kaiser Alexander Nr. 1, Oberst Otto Knappe von Knappstädt
  - 3. Garde-Grenadier-Regiment Königin Elisabeth, Oberst Gustav Karl Ludwig von Pritzelwitz
- 4. Garde-Infanterie-Brigade: Generalmajor Leopold von Loën
  - Kaiser Franz-Garde-Grenadier-Regiment Nr. 2 Oberst Gustav von Fabeck
  - 4. Garde-Grenadier-Regiment Königin, Oberst Otto von Strubberg
  - Garde-Schützen-Bataillon Major von Besser
  - 3. Garde-Ulanen-Regiment, Oberst Mirus
  - 4 batteries, Major von der Goltz
- Heavy Guard Cavalry Brigade
  - Life Guards
  - Garde-Kürassiere, Prince Albert of Prussia
  - Reserve-Artillerie, 5 batteries, Oberst Prince Kraft of Hohenlohe-Ingelfingen

== Course of War ==
During the Austro-Prussian War the Second Army received its marching orders from Von Moltke. He ordered the I Corps to move via Liebau and Trautenau to Arnau, the Guards Corps to move via Neurode, Braunau, Eypel to Koniginhof, the V Corps to move via Glatz, Reinerz, Nachod to Gradlitz, and the VI Corps to move from Waldenburg, via Trautenau to Koniginhof. While the Army of the Elbe and the First Army were ordered to campaign further to the east; the I Corps concentrated at Liebau and Schomberg, the V Corps was at Reinerz, about twenty miles from the I, and the Guards Corps just crossed the frontier, in front of Neurode, which was between the two corps. The VI Corps was at Landeck and Glatz.

On June 23, the Second Army pushed its I Corps against Trautenau. The I Corps was divided into left and right columns. They arrived at Trautenau on 27 June. Unlike what they anticipated, Trautenau was not occupied by the Austrians. Thus Friedrich von Clausewitz, commander of the left column, waited for the right column for 2 hours (8 AM - 10 AM). While waiting, Austrian forces arrived and attacked the Prussian forces. About 3 o'clock the Austrian X Corps, commanded by Ludwig von Gablenz, arrived on the field. Then the other forces of the I Corps arrived to reinforce the Friedrich von Clausewitz. However the vigorous attack of the Austrians compelled the Prussians to retreat.

On 28 June, at 1 o'clock in the morning, Crown Prince Frederick William of Prussia received the news of the loss at Trautenau. He ordered his divisions to again attack the Austrian X Corps. The divisions and the Guards Corps fought a tactical victory for Prussia. The Prussians lost 713 men in the battle while the Austrians lost 3,674 men. On the same day the V Corps, commanded by Karl Friedrich von Steinmetz, was fighting against the Austrians at Česká Skalice. During that battle the Prussians lost 1,365 men against Austrian losses of almost 6,000 men.

On 29 June, Frederick ordered a general advance. The I Corps marched to Pilníkov and the Guards Corps to Koniginhof. The V Corps marched to Schweinschädel, meeting several Austrian Brigades on the way. There they fought the Austrians in another victorious battle.

On 30 June, Chief of Staff General von Moltke ordered the Second Army to stay in the upper Elbe area.

During the Battle of Königgrätz, the Second Army was not on the battlefield but started to advance from 8 o'clock in the morning. At 8 o'clock, the V Corps and VI Corps started their march while the I Corps began theirs at 9:30. However the arrival was delayed by bad road conditions due to heavy rains. Still the arrival of Second Army proved to be decisive and lethal for the Austrians.

== See also ==
- Königgrätz order of battle
