= 119th Infantry Division (German Empire) =

119th Infantry Division (119. Infanterie-Division)
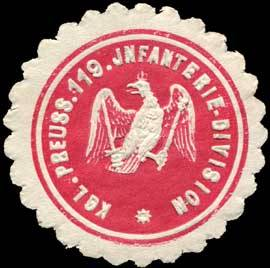
- Seal mark of the division
- Active: 25 March 1915 – 1919
- Country: German Empire
- Branch: Imperial German Army
- Type: Infantry
- Size: Approx. 12,500
- Engagements: World War I: Gorlice–Tarnów Offensive; Battle of Messines; Battle of Passchendaele; Battle of Cambrai; German spring offensive; First Battle of the Somme (1918); Battle of the Lys; Second Battle of the Somme (1918)

The 119th Infantry Division (119. Infanterie-Division) was a formation of the Imperial German Army in World War I. The division was formed on March 25, 1915, and organized over the next several weeks. It was part of a wave of new infantry divisions formed in the spring of 1915. The division was disbanded in 1919 during the demobilization of the German Army after World War I.

The division was formed primarily from the excess infantry regiments of regular infantry divisions, which were being triangularized. The division's 237th Infantry Brigade staff was formerly the staff of the 19th Infantry Brigade of the 10th Infantry Division, which came to the new division along with the 46th Infantry Regiment. The 46th Reserve Infantry Regiment was formerly part of the 10th Reserve Division. The 58th Infantry Regiment came from the 9th Infantry Division. The division was primarily recruited in the V Army Corps area (Posen and Lower Silesia).

== Combat chronicle ==
The 119th Infantry Division initially fought on the Eastern Front in World War I, entering the line in April as part of "Combined Corps Kneussl" (Kombiniertes Korps Kneussl) and then fighting in the battle of Gorlice-Tarnów and the ensuing Gorlice-Tarnów Offensive. In August 1915, it participated in the attack on Brest-Litovsk. From September 1915 to March 1916, the division occupied the line between the Servech and Shchara Rivers, near Baranovichi. It remained in the line in Russia until May 1917, when it was transferred to the Western Front, where it was initially stationed on the Belgian/Dutch border. It went into the line in Flanders in May and fought in the Battle of Messines and the Battle of Passchendaele. It was removed from the line to rest in October and returned to line to face the Allied attack in the Battle of Cambrai. In 1918, the division participated in the German spring offensive, fighting in the First Battle of the Somme (1918), also known as the Second Battle of the Somme (to distinguish it from the 1916 battle), and the Battle of the Lys, also known as the Fourth Battle of Ypres. It later fought in the Second Battle of the Somme (1918), also known as the Third Battle of the Somme. It remained in the line until the end of the war. Allied intelligence rated the division as second class.

== Order of battle on formation ==
The 119th Infantry Division was formed as a triangular division. The order of battle of the division on March 25, 1915, was as follows:

- 237. Infanterie-Brigade
  - Infanterie-Regiment Graf Kirchbach (1. Niederschlesisches) Nr. 46
  - 3. Posensches Infanterie-Regiment Nr.58
  - Reserve-Infanterie-Regiment Nr. 46
- 3.Eskadron/Ulanen-Regiment Kaiser Alexander III von Rußland (Westpreußisches ) Nr. 1
- 4.Eskadron/Regiment Königs-Jäger zu Pferde Nr. 1
- Feldartillerie-Regiment Nr. 237
- Fußartillerie-Batterie Nr. 119
- Pionier-Kompanie Nr. 237

== Late-war order of battle ==
The division underwent relatively few organizational changes over the course of the war. Cavalry was reduced, artillery and signals commands were formed, and combat engineer support was expanded to a full pioneer battalion. The order of battle on March 10, 1918, was as follows:

- 237.Infanterie-Brigade
  - Infanterie-Regiment Graf Kirchbach (1. Niederschlesisches) Nr. 46
  - 3. Posensches Infanterie-Regiment Nr.58
  - Reserve-Infanterie-Regiment Nr. 46
  - Maschinengewehr-Scharfschützen-Abteilung Nr. 15
- 4.Eskadron/Regiment Königs-Jäger zu Pferde Nr. 1
- Artillerie-Kommandeur 119
  - Feldartillerie-Regiment Nr. 237
  - I.Bataillon/Fußartillerie-Regiment Nr. 27
- Pionier-Bataillon Nr. 119
  - Pionier-Kompanie Nr. 237
  - Pionier-Kompanie Nr. 273
  - Minenwerfer-Kompanie Nr. 119
- Divisions-Nachrichten-Kommandeur 119
