= Battle of Schweinschädel =

Coordinates: 50°23′45″N 15°59′9″E

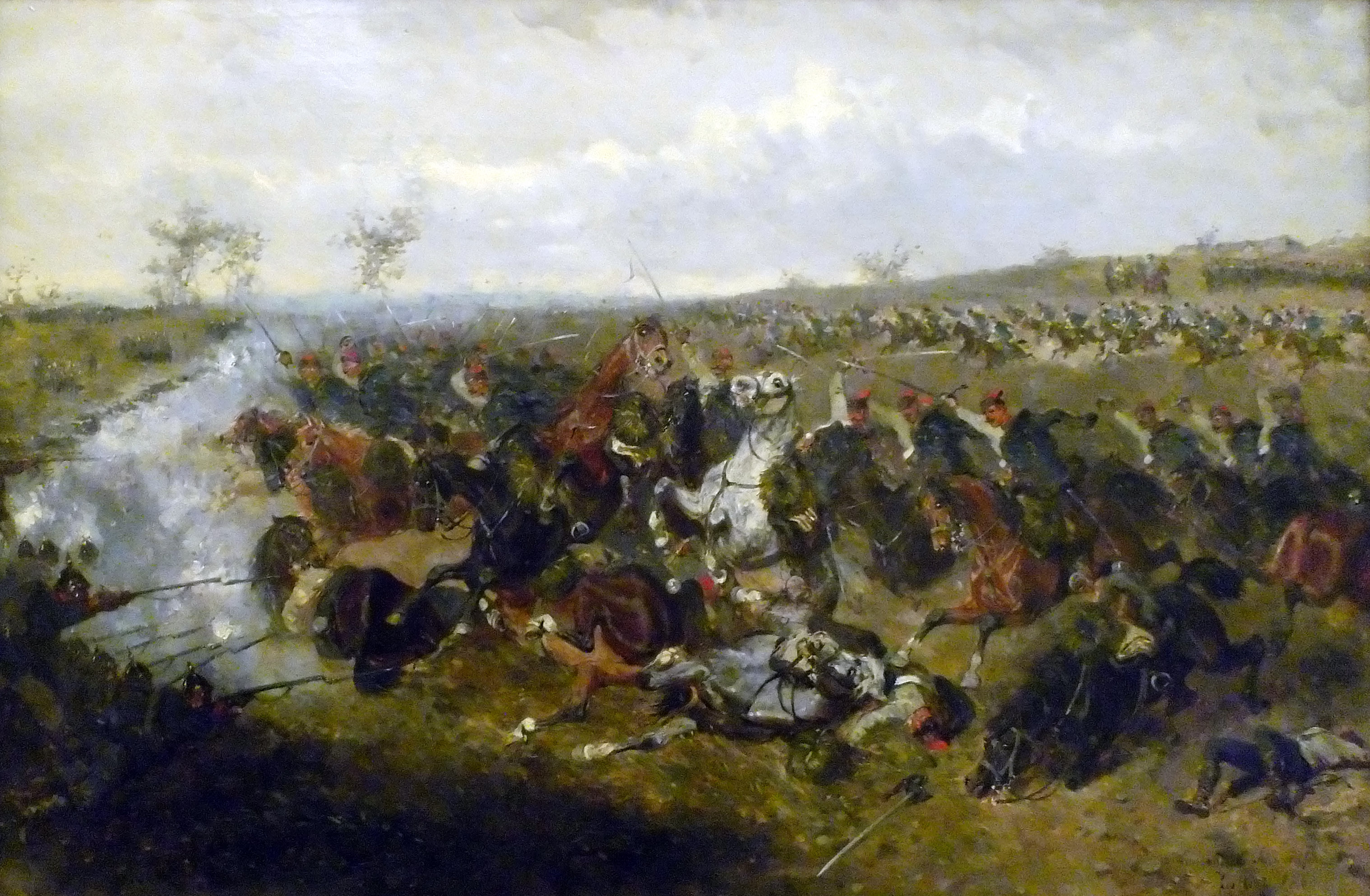
- Battle of Schweinschädel by Alexander von Bensa
Date	29 June 1866
Location	Schweinschädel, Bohemia, Austrian Empire
Result	Prussian Victory

Belligerents
Prussia	Austrian Empire

Commanders and leaders
Karl von Steinmetz; Hugo von Kirchbach	Tassilo Festetics

Units involved
V Army Corps	IV Army Corps

Strength
24,000 (2 divisions)	20,000 (3 brigades)

Casualties and losses
394 killed and wounded	1,450 dead, wounded and captured

The Battle of Schweinschädel (Czech: Bitva u Svinišťan) took place during the Austro-Prussian War between Prussia and Austria on 29 June 1866. The IV Army Corps of the Austrian Army under Tassilo Festetics tried to stop the advance of the Prussian 2nd Army under Crown Prince Friedrich, but was defeated by the V Army Corps under General von Steinmetz and had to withdraw.

== Starting positions ==
The three Prussian armies had marched into Bohemia from different sides and separated by the Giant Mountains. While the Prussian chief of staff Moltke wanted to achieve the unification of his armies, the Austrian commander-in-chief, Feldzeugmeister Benedek, tried to use his supposed advantage of the inner line to unite with the Saxon army and to defeat the first army under Friedrich Karl separately from the other armies. After the Battle of Skalitz, however, the second army had reached the rear of the Austrian army which required a fundamental regrouping by Benedek.

On 29 June 1866, Benedek planned a retreat in the direction of Königgrätz to ensure this should Festetics with his IV Army Corps stop the second army. While a part of the Queenhof was supposed to oppose the Prussian Guard Corps, another part was supposed to delay Steinmetz's advance.

V Corps was marching to Gradlitz in order to join other forces of Second Army. On the way, the V Corps met the Austrian Army.

== Advance on Schweinschadel ==
On 29 June 1866, the Austrian reconnaissance patrols revealed that the guards were still at Praussnitz and the V Corps at Skalitz. The VI Army corps under Louis von Mutius was still behind on the way via Náchod, his first brigade was initially assigned to the V Corps. Steinmetz had to give his troops a break after the march through the mountains and two heavy skirmishes and did not leave until about 2:00 p.m. To this end, he issued the following marching orders:

“The V Army Corps with the detachment of Major General von Hoffmann will continue the march on Gradlitz today. The avant-garde (under special orders from Lieutenant General von Kirchbach) leaves at 2 p.m., goes from Zlic via the Úpa to Ratiboritz, from there via Westec and Westernec to tour the left wing of the enemy outpost chain behind the Trebesnow-Miskoles section, clears the terrain against Horicka on the right flank and wins the Chawalkowic-Gradlitz road. The main body, the reserve artillery and General von Hoffmann follow Lieutenant General von Kirchbach. "

== The battle ==
From this advance the first artillery battles developed with the Austrian batteries set up near Schweinschädel. Although he was not to fight with superior enemy troops, but only to achieve a delay, Festetics did not want to leave his position without a fight, so as not to weaken the morale of his troops, and so the batteries remained in position and fired at them Prussia forming an attack.

The Prussian 10th Division under General von Kirchbach ordered the 19th Infantry Brigade under General von Tiedemann (Grenadier Regiment No. 6 and Infantry Regiment No. 46) to take action against the Austrian batteries to attack the brickworks there. FML Festetics threw the brigade under Colonel Poeckh (Infantry Regiments No. 37 and 51, and 8th Jäger Battalion) against the Prussians . The Austrian brigade under Archduke Josef (infantry regiments No. 67 and 68, as well as the 30th Jäger Battalion), which was not in combat, had taken up position south of Schweinschädel between the Úpa river and the road to Josefov (Jaroměř) .

The first attacks by the Prussians led to the penetration into the town of Schweinschädel, where they inflicted considerable losses on the Austrian defenders with the rapid fire of their breech-loaders. In support of the attack, five Prussian batteries were raised to support the advance of the infantry. When the Prussian regiments penetrated further into the place, there was a fight over a massive dairy farm, which was defended by a battalion of the Austrian Infantry Regiment No. 37 under Lieutenant Colonel Augustin Terstyánszky. This unit offered resistance to the Prussians for a long time, but was almost completely wiped out or fell into captivity.

General von Steinmetz had the further attack broken off when his regiments were already over the place. After the end of the battle, Festetics withdrew via the Úpa and was able to successfully break away from his pursuers. The Prussian advance towards Gradlitz was continued from Schweinschädel.

== Losses ==
The Prussians lost 15 officers, 379 soldiers and 15 horses, of which 8 officers and 77 soldiers were killed; the Austrians, on the other hand, 39 officers, 1,411 soldiers (320 of them captured) and 90 horses. Of the prisoners, 120 were not wounded. Regiment No. 37 had the heaviest losses with 1026 men.

== Literature ==
- Geoffrey Wawro: The Austro-Prussian War. Cambridge University Press, Cambridge 1998, ISBN 978-0-521-62951-5.
- Wilhelm Rüstrow: Der Krieg von 1866 in Deutschland und Italien Online verfügbar bei Google Books
- Österreichs Kämpfe im Jahre 1866 Vom K.und K. Generalstab. Bureau für Kriegsgeschichte Online verfügbar bei Google Books
- Der Feldzug von 1866 in Deutschland, Kriegsgeschichtliche Abteilung des großen Generalstabes Online verfügbar bei Google Books
- Prussian General Staff (1872). The Campaign of 1866 in Germany.
- Bodart, Gaston (1908). Militär-historisches Kriegs-Lexikon (1618–1905) (in German). C. W. Stern. p. 547.
