= Tasziló Festetics =

Tasziló Festetics or Tassiló Festetics de Tolna may refer to a family member of the Festetics family with the first name being Tasziló:

- Tassiló Festetics de Tolna (Hungarian noble, born 1813)
- Tasziló Festetics (Hungarian noble, born 1850)
