= Army of the Elbe =

The Army of the Elbe (German: Elbarmee) was a Prussian formation during the Austro-Prussian War. Being a wartime organization of the Prussian Army; it afterwards was demobilized. According to von Moltke's strategy, the Prussian Army was to march into the Kingdom of Bohemia in three independently operating units and fight Austria's northern army there. The division into three armies was heavily criticized by contemporaries, but remained victorious.

== Creation ==
Helmuth von Moltke the Elder created the Army of the Elbe for the Austro-Prussian War. It was one of three main field armies of the Prussian Army established during that war. The Army of the Elbe consisted of three division, two cavalry brigades and 144 guns. When it was created the unit were in cantonments around Torgau. Commanded by General Karl Eberhard Herwarth von Bittenfeld; the Army of the Elbe used to be the VIII Corps, reinforced by the 14th Division. Chief of Staff was Oberst Ludwig von Schlotheim.

== Order of Battle ==
The Army of the Elbe had the following order of battle:

Commanding General: General Karl Eberhard Herwarth von Bittenfeld

Chief of Staff: Oberst Ludwig von Schlotheim

Chief of Artillery: Oberst Hermann von Rozynski-Manger

=== 14th Division ===
- 14. Division, Hugo Eberhard zu Münster-Meinhövel
  - Brigade „Schwarzkoppen“ (27. Infanterie-Brigade), Emil von Schwartzkoppen
    - 3. Westfälisches Infanterie-Regiment Nr. 16, Oberst von Schwartz
    - 7. Westfälisches Infanterie-Regiment Nr. 56, Oberst Adolf von Dorpowski
  - Brigade „Hiller“ (28. Infanterie-Brigade), Wilhelm August Bernhard von Hiller
    - 4. Westfälisches Infanterie-Regiment Nr. 17, Oberst von Kottwitz
    - 8. Westfälisches Infanterie-Regiment Nr. 57, Oberst Albert von der Osten
  - Westfälisches Dragoner-Regiment Nr. 7, Oberst von Ribbeck

=== VII Corps ===
- 15. Division, Philipp Carl von Canstein
  - Brigade „Stückradt“ (29. Infanterie-Brigade), Generalmajor Alexander von Stuckrad
    - Niederrheinisches Füsilier-Regiment Nr. 39, Oberstleutnant von Zimmermann
    - 5. Rheinisches Infanterie-Regiment Nr. 65, Oberst du Trossel
  - Brigade „Glasenapp“ (30. Infanterie-Brigade), Otto von Glasenapp
    - 2. Rheinisches Infanterie-Regiment Nr. 28, Oberst von Gerstein-Hohenstein
    - 6. Rheinisches Infanterie-Regiment Nr. 68, Oberst Wilhelm von Gayl
  - Königs-Husaren-Regiment (1. Rheinisches) Nr. 7, Oberst von Lindern
- 16. Division, August von Etzel
  - Brigade „Schöler“ (31. Infanterie-Brigade), Generalmajor Alexander von Schoeler
    - 3. Rheinisches Infanterie-Regiment Nr. 29, Oberst Ernst Wilhelm Schuler von Senden
    - 7. Rheinisches Infanterie-Regiment Nr. 69, Oberst von Beyer
  - Füsilier-Brigade
    - Ostpreußisches Füsilier-Regiment Nr. 33, Oberst August Ferdinand von Wegerer
    - Pommersches Füsilier-Regiment Nr. 34, Oberst Wilhelm von Schmeling

=== Cavalry ===
- 8th (Rhenish) Cuirassiers "Count Geßler"
- Westfälisches Ulanen-Regiment Nr. 5
- Ulanen-Regiment „Großherzog Friedrich von Baden“ (Rheinisches) Nr. 7
- 2nd Westphalian Hussar Regiment, No. 11

== Course of War ==
The Army of the Elbe was one of the three columns attacking Austria. The Army of the Elbe was very close to the First Army, commanded by Prince Friedrich Karl of Prussia; who commanded all attacks. The two field armies lacked supplies but still were victorious in its battles. On 16 June they started the invasion of the Kingdom of Saxony after the Saxon Army had retreated to Bohemia. The Battle of Königgrätz was started by Elbe Army's offensive to Dresden. They were the first to get attacked during the battle. However General von Bittenfeld did not order a main attack against the Austrians.

== See also ==
- Königgrätz order of battle
- First Army
- Second Army

== Literature ==
- Wagner, Arthur Lockwood (1899). The Campaign of Königgrätz: A Study of the Austro-Prussian Conflict in the Light of the American Civil War.
- Prussian General Staff (1872). The Campaign of 1866 in Germany.
