= Anton Mollinary von Monte Pastello =

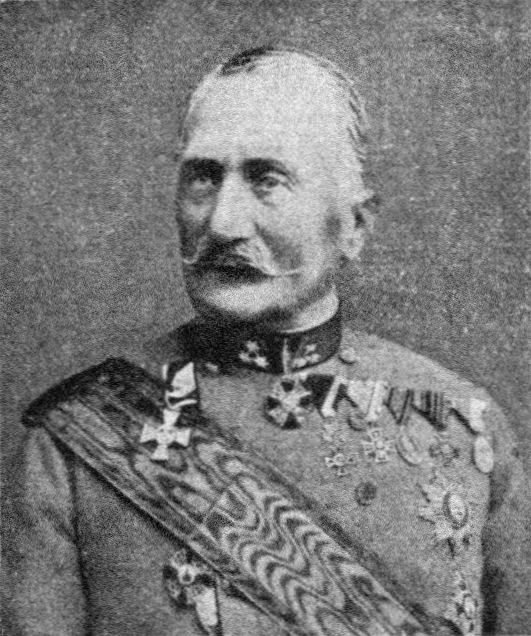
- Born: October 8, 1820; Titel, Slavonia, Austria
- Died: October 26, 1904 (aged 84); Como, Lombardy, Italy
- Military career
- Allegiance: Austrian Empire; Austria-Hungary
- Branch: Austria Army; Austro-Hungarian Army
- Service years: 1833 – 1879
- Rank: General of the Artillery
- Conflicts: First Italian War of Independence: Battle of Curtatone and Montanara; Second Italian War of Independence; Austro-Prussian War: Battle of Schweinschädel; Battle of Königgrätz (WIA)
- Awards: Order of Leopold

Anton Mollinary Freiherr von Monte Pastello was an Austro-Hungarian General of the Artillery and writer. He was known for being the Deputy of the 4th Corps during the Battle of Königgrätz and had an extensive campaign within mid 19th-century conflicts involving Austria.

== Military career ==
He was the son of Karl Mollinary (1792–1868), lieutenant colonel in the Tchaikist frontier battalion in Titel. Monte Pastello desired for a military career and in 1833, he enlisted in the Imperial and Royal Pioneer School in the monastery barracks at Tulln an der Donau as a cadet before graduating in 1837 as a second lieutenant as he was assigned at the 45th Galician Infantry Regiment. Two years later, he was transferred to the staff of the Pioneer Corps in Vienna and reported there to Lieutenant Colonel Karl von Birago.

After being transferred to the Quartermaster General's staff, he began to implement Birago's ideas in 1846, reorganizing the Imperial and Royal Danube flotilla and incorporated the river boats of the "Tschaikisten" into it. The Lake Garda Flotilla, of which he was commander until 1860, was also created under his leadership. In 1847 he visited the United Kingdom, France, Greece and Turkey on extensive fact-finding trips. On August 12, 1842, he was promoted to first lieutenant to the 9th Graf Hartmann Infantry Regiment, March 1, 1843, to general quartermaster, January 15, 1847, to captain and on February 21, 1849, to major.

During the First Italian War of Independence, Mollinary was assigned to the Italian army of Field Marshal Josef Radetzky and took part in the campaigns against the Piedmontese such as the Battle of Curtatone and Montanara. For his service in the war, he was awarded the Knight's Cross of the Order of Leopold. From September 1850, he then commanded seven years as a lieutenant colonel in the engineer and flotilla corps before being promoted in 1854 as a colonel, first on the Danube then on the waters in Northern Italy. In 1851 Mollinary was meanwhile logistically involved in the task of bringing the Austrian corps to Holstein after the First Schleswig War, where it was used for pacification purposes.

He was promoted to major general on January 30, 1858, and commanded an infantry brigade in Milan and during the Second Italian War of Independence in 1859 was the commander of the fortress of Ancona, which at that time still belonged to the Papal States. In 1860, he took command of a brigade in Ljubljana, Carniola. In 1864 he was assigned to the staff of the V Army Corps. On June 3, 1865, he was promoted to Field Marshal Lieutenant and appointed Deputy Commander of the IV Corps.

In the Battle of Schweinschädel at Bohemia which took place on June 29, 1866, during the Austro-Prussian War, Mollinary also fought against the needle gun for the first time and had to acknowledge the technical superiority of the Prussians. On July 3, 1866, in the Battle of Königgrätz, he took command of the IV Corps where its commander, Feldzeugmeister Tassilo Festetics de Tolna had been seriously wounded, but had no information about the approach of the Crown Prince Friedrich III's army remained. Mollinary gave up his defensive position and in the morning deployed his forces together with II Corps against Swiepwald, which was held by the Prussians. The attack was repulsed with heavy losses and his units were then surrounded by the Prussian Guard Corps with Mollinary getting wounded in the process.

In 1868 he was promoted to lieutenant general, was initially employed as a "national defense commander" in Innsbruck and in 1870 was appointed Kommandierender General of the XIII Corps and chief of administration in the Croatian-Slavonian border region transferred to Agram. On April 23, 1873, he was promoted to Feldzeugmeister. He did not receive the supreme command of the Bosnian campaign that he expected, because his views on an Austrian Greater Croatia made him politically unpopular with the Hungarians and especially with the Foreign Minister Gyula Andrássy and he was sidelined. In 1877 he was appointed commanding general to the IX Corps after Brno and the following year for the XI Corps transferred to Lemberg.

Mollinary retired on November 1, 1879, living on his estate on Lake Como.

== Works ==
- "Reisebericht betreffend Frankreichs Pontonierwesen, Kanonen- u. Mörserboote, schwimmende Batterien, nebst allgemeinen militärischen Notizen über die französische Armee" (1856)
- "Über die Benützung der Dampf- und Schleppschiffe bei Truppen-Verschiffungen und Fluß-Übergängen“ (1858)
- "Studie über die Operationen und Tactique der Franzosen im Feldzuge 1859 in Italien“ (1864)
- "Erwiderung auf den Artikel „Rückblicke auf d. Krieg 1866“ von S. von Pollatschek, Oberstleutnant im k. k. Generalstabe (1868)
- "46 Jahre im österreichisch-ungarischen Heere 1833–1879“, 2 Bde., (1905) (franz. 1913/14)
- "Die Römerstraßen in der europäischen Türkei“ (1914)
