= First Army (Austro-Prussian War) =

Military unit

The First Army was a Prussian formation during the Austro-Prussian War. Being a wartime organization of the Prussian Army; it afterwards was demobilized.

== Formation ==
For the Austro-Prussian War the Prussians organized their forces into three, and eventually four, field armies. Helmuth von Moltke, Chief of the Prussian General Staff, assigned four corps to attack the area of the Austria-allied kingdoms of Hanover and Saxony. The command of the First Army was given to Prince Friedrich Karl of Prussia, a nephew of King William of Prussia. The young General der Kavallerie had served in the First Schleswig War and Second Schleswig War and already received the prestigious Pour le Mérite with oak leaves. Chief of Staff was to be Generalleutnant Konstantin Bernhard von Voigts-Rhetz, who was an intelligent but opinionated officer.

== Course of war ==
During the war the First Army did not operate effectively in the opinion of the war-directing General Staff. Prince Friedrich Karl's marching orders strained the army's supply lines and prevented a link with Second Army. Fortunately, the First Army was able to link up with the Army of the Elbe, commanded by Karl Eberhard Herwarth von Bittenfeld. On June 28 both armies operated against Mnichovo Hradiště which turned into the Battle of Münchengrätz. The prince then ordered the 3rd Division to march to Jičín. Even though the campaign was successful many men died before reaching the battlefields. The combined operation of two armies worsened the already bad supply situation. When the armies marched separately again the First Army was the first in the Battle of Königgrätz, fighting against the Austrians under Ludwig von Benedek until the Second Army of Crown-Prince Frederick William of Prussia arrived.

== Order of Battle ==
The First Army had the following order of battle:

Commanding General: General der Kavallerie Prince Friedrich Karl of Prussia

Chief of Staff: Generalleutnant Konstantin Bernhard von Voigts-Rhetz
Quartermaster General: Generalmajor Ferdinand von Stülpnagel
Chief of Artillery: Generalmajor Albert von Lengsfeld
Chief Engineer: Generalmajor Karl Keiser

=== II Corps ===
Commanding General: Generalleutnant Stephan von Schmidt
Chief of Staff: Generalmajor Georg von Kameke

- 3rd Division August von Werder
  - 5th Infantry Brigade Ludwig von Januschowski
    - Grenadier-Regiment "König Friedrich Wilhelm IV." (1. Pommersches) Nr. 2 Oberst Ernst von Reichenbach
    - 5. Pommersches Infanterie-Regiment Nr. 42 Oberst Ferdinand von Borcke
  - 6th Infantry Brigade Karl Friedrich Wilhelm von Winterfeldt
    - 3. Pommersches Infanterie-Regiment Nr. 14 Oberst Alexander von Stahr
    - 7. Pommersches Infanterie-Regiment Nr. 54 Oberstleutnant Benno von Kurowski
    - Pommersches Jäger-Bataillon Nr. 2
  - Division Cavalry Pomeranian Hussar Regiment No. 5 Oberst Tamm von Flemming
- 4th Division Friedrich Herwarth von Bittenfeld
  - 7th Infantry Brigade, Ludwig von Schlabrendorff
    - 2. Pommersches Grenadier-Regiment (Colberg) Nr. 9, Oberst Karl Gustav von Sandrart
    - 6. Pommersches Infanterie-Regiment Nr. 49, Oberst Gustav von Wietersheim
  - 8th Infantry Brigade, Bernhard von Hanneken
    - 4. Pommersches Infanterie-Regiment Nr. 21, Oberst Franz von Krane-Matena
    - 8. Pommersches Infanterie-Regiment Nr. 61, Oberst Hermann von Michaelis
  - Divisions Kavallerie 1. Pommersches Ulanen-Regiment Nr. 4, Oberst Fedor von Kleist
  - Korps-Reserve Artillerie, Oberst von Puttkammer

=== III Corps ===
Directly subordinate to the army

- 5th Division Wilhelm von Tümpling
  - 9th Infantry Brigade Genarlamajor Gustav von Schimmelmann
    - Grenadier-Regiment "König Friedrich Wilhelm IV." (1. Pommersches) Nr. 2 Oberst Ernst von Reichenbach
    - 5. Pommersches Infanterie-Regiment Nr. 42 Oberst Ferdinand von Borcke
  - 10th Infantry Brigade Wilhelm von Kamienski
    - 2. Pommersches Infanterie-Regiment Nr. 14 Oberst Kolmar von Debschitz
    - 1. Pommersches Infanterie-Regiment Nr. 54 Oberst Karl von Kettler
  - Division Cavalry Pomeranian Hussar Regiment No. 5 Oberstleutnant Eugen von Treskow
- 6th Division Albrecht Gustav von Manstein
  - 11th Infantry Brigade, Hermann von Gersdorff
    - Brandenburgisches Füsilier-Regiment Nr. 35, Oberst Louis von Rothmaler
    - 7. Brandenburgisches Infanterie-Regiment Nr. 64, Oberst Ernst von Hartmann
  - 12th Infantry Brigade, Bernhard von Hanneken
    - 4. Brandenburgisches Infanterie-Regiment Nr. 24, Oberst Emil von Hacke
    - 8. Pommersches Infanterie-Regiment Nr. 61, Oberst Johann von Götz und Schwanenflies
  - Divisions Kavallerie Brandenburgisches Dragoner-Regiment Nr. 2, Oberstleutnant Carl Heinichen

=== IV Corps ===
Directly subordinate to the army

- 7th Division, Eduard von Fransecky
  - 13. Infanterie-Brigade, Julius von Groß
    - 1. Magdeburgisches Infanterie-Regiment Nr. 26, Oberst Alexander von Medem
    - 3. Magdeburgisches Infanterie-Regiment Nr. 66, Oberst Adolf von Blanckensee
  - 14. Infanterie-Brigade, Generalmajor Helmuth von Gordon
    - 2. Magdeburgisches Infanterie-Regiment Nr. 27, Oberst Franz von Zychlinski
    - 4. Magdeburgisches Infanterie-Regiment Nr. 67, Oberst Eduard von Bothmer
  - Divisions Kavallerie Magdeburgisches Husaren-Regiment Nr. 10, Oberst Hermann von Besser
- 8. Division, August von Horn
  - 15. Infanterie-Brigade, Julius von Bose
    - 1. Thüringisches Infanterie-Regiment Nr. 31, Oberst Louis von Freyhold
    - 3. Thüringisches Infanterie-Regiment Nr. 71, Oberst Karl von Avemann
  - 16. Infanterie-Brigade (Deutsches Kaiserreich), Leopold von Stuckrad
    - 4. Thüringisches Infanterie-Regiment Nr. 72, Oberst von Bruno Neidhardt von Gneisenau
    - Magdeburgisches Jäger-Bataillon Nr. 4
  - Divisions Kavallerie Thüringisches Ulanen-Regiment Nr. 6, Oberstleutnant Ferdinand August von Langermann und Erlencamp

=== Cavalry Corps ===
Commanding General: General der Kavallerie Prince Albert of Prussia
Chief of Staff: Oberstleutnant Karl von Witzendorff

- 1st Cavalry Division, Hermann von Alvensleben
  - 1. Leichte Kavallerie-Brigade, Generalmajor Albert von Rheinbaben
    - 1. Garde-Ulanen-Regiment, Oberst Enno von Colomb
    - 2. Garde-Ulanen-Regiment, Oberst Wilhelm von Brandenburg
    - 1. Garde-Dragoner-Regiment, Oberstleutnant Friedrich Magnus von Barner
  - 2. Schwere Kavallerie-Brigade, Generalmajor Wolf von Pfuel
    - Brandenburgisches Kürassier-Regiment Nr. 6, Oberst Alfred von Rauch
    - Magdeburgisches Kürassier-Regiment, Oberst Hiob von Hontheim
- 2nd Cavalry Division, Benno Hann von Weyhern
  - 2. Leichte Kavallerie-Brigade, Generalmajor Wilhelm zu Mecklenburg-Schwerin
    - 2. Garde-Dragoner-Regiment, Oberst Hermann von Redern
    - Brandenburgisches Husaren-Regiment (Zietensche Husaren) Nr. 3, Oberstleutnant Adalbert von Kalkreuth
    - 2. Brandenburgisches Ulanen Regiment Nr. 1, Oberstleutnant Friedrich Wilhelm zu Hohenlohe-Ingelfingen
  - 3. Leichte Kavallerie-Brigade, Generalmajor Georg von der Groeben
    - Neumärkisches Dragoner Regiment Nr. 3, Oberstleutnant Karl von Willisen
    - Thüringisches Husaren-Regiment Nr. 12, Oberst Gustav von Barnekow

The following detached units also belonged to the corps:

- 1. Schwere Kavallerie-Brigade, Generalmajor Prince Albert of Prussia
  - Regiment der Gardes du Corps, Oberst Friedrich von Brandenburg
  - Garde-Kürassier-Regiment, Oberstleutnant Hermann von Lüderitz
- 3. Schwere Kavallerie-Brigade, Generalmajor Wasa von der Goltz
  - Kürassier-Regiment "Königin" (Pommersches) Nr. 2, Oberst August von Schaevenbach
  - 2. Pommersches Ulanen-Regiment Nr. 9, Oberst Otto von Diepenbroick-Grüter

== See also ==
- Königgrätz order of battle

== Literature ==
- Wagner, Arthur Lockwood (1899). The Campaign of Königgrätz: A Study of the Austro-Prussian Conflict in the Light of the American Civil War.
- Prussian General Staff (1872). The Campaign of 1866 in Germany.
- Wawro, Geoffery (1997). The Austro-Prussian War: Austria's war with Prussia and Italy in 1866. Cambridge University Press. ISBN 978-0-521-62951-5.
