= 10th Division (German Empire) =

10th Division (10. Division); in 1870–1871 and from August 2, 1914, 10th Infantry Division (10. Infanterie-Division)
- Active: 1818–1919
- Country: Prussia/Germany
- Branch: Army
- Type: Infantry (in peacetime included cavalry)
- Size: Approx. 15,000
- Part of: V. Army Corps (V. Armeekorps)
- Garrison/HQ: Posen
- Engagements: Austro-Prussian War: Königgrätz Franco-Prussian War: Wissembourg, Wörth, Sedan, Paris World War I: Verdun, German spring offensive, 3rd Aisne, 2nd Marne

Commanders
- Notable commanders: August Karl von Goeben, Otto von Emmich

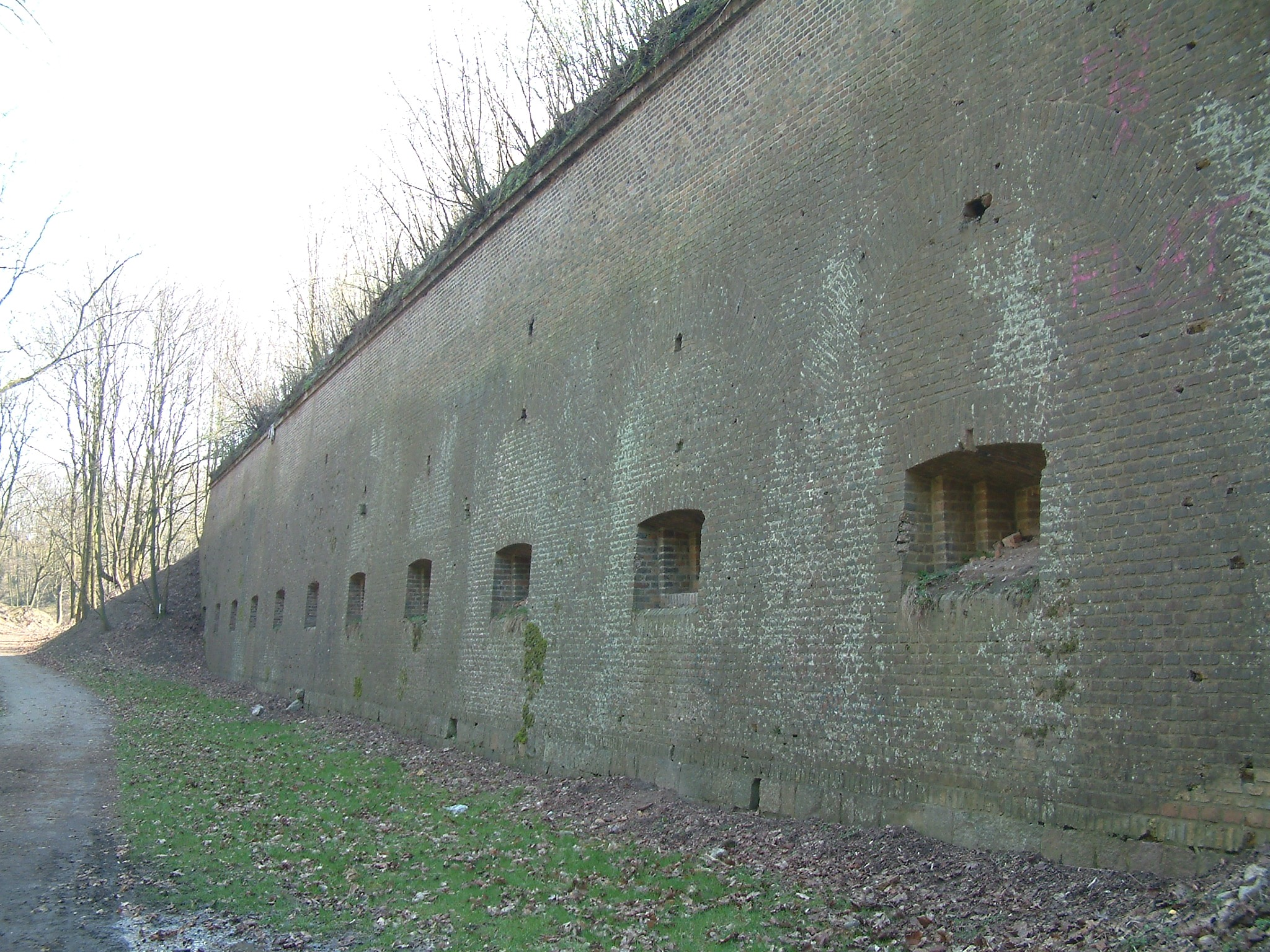

The 10th Division (10. Division) was a unit of the Prussian/German Army. It was formed in Posen (now Poznań, Poland) in November 1816 as a brigade, became the 9th Division on September 5, 1818, and was renumbered the 10th Division on February 28, 1820. The division was subordinated in peacetime to the V Army Corps (V. Armeekorps). The division was disbanded in 1919, during the demobilization of the German Army after World War I. The division was recruited primarily in the Province of Posen.

== Combat chronicle ==
The division fought in the Austro-Prussian War in 1866, including the Battle of Königgrätz. In the Franco-Prussian War of 1870–1871, the division saw action in the opening battles of Wissembourg and Wörth, in the Battle of Sedan, and in the Siege of Paris.

In World War I, the division served on the Western Front. It initially occupied the Woëvre region of France and later fought in the Verdun in late 1916. In 1918, it participated in the German spring offensive, seeing action in the Third Battle of the Aisne and the Second Battle of the Marne. Allied intelligence rated it a first class division.

== Order of battle in the Franco-Prussian War ==
During wartime, the 10th Division, like other regular German divisions, was redesignated an infantry division. The organization of the 10th Infantry Division in 1870 at the beginning of the Franco-Prussian War was as follows:

- 19. Infanterie Brigade
  - Grenadier-Regiment Nr. 6
  - Infanterie-Regiment Nr. 46
- 20. Infanterie Brigade
  - Füsilier-Regiment Nr. 37
  - Füsilier-Regiment Nr. 50
- Dragoner-Regiment Nr. 14

== Pre-World War I organization ==
German divisions underwent various organizational changes after the Franco-Prussian War. The organization of the 10th Division in 1914, shortly before the outbreak of World War I, was as follows:

- 19. Infanterie Brigade
  - Grenadier-Regiment Graf Kleist von Nollendorf (1. Westpreußisches) Nr. 6
  - Infanterie-Regiment Graf Kirchbach (1. Niederschlesisches) Nr. 46
- 20. Infanterie Brigade
  - Infanterie-Regiment König Ludwig III. von Bayern (2. Niederschlesisches) Nr. 47
  - 3. Niederschlesisches Infanterie-Regiment Nr. 50
- 77. Infanterie-Brigade
  - Füsilier-Regiment von Steinmetz (Westpreußisches) Nr. 37
  - 7. Westpreußisches Infanterie-Regiment Nr. 155
- 10. Kavallerie-Brigade
  - Ulanen-Regiment Kaiser Alexander III. von Rußland (Westpreußisches) Nr. 1
  - Regiment Königs-Jäger zu Pferde Nr. 1
- 10. Feldartillerie-Brigade
  - 1. Posensches Feldartillerie-Regiment Nr. 20
  - 2. Posensches Feldartillerie-Regiment Nr. 56
- Landwehr-Inspektion Posen

== Order of battle on mobilization ==
On mobilization in August 1914 at the beginning of World War I, most divisional cavalry, including brigade headquarters, was withdrawn to form cavalry divisions or split up among divisions as reconnaissance units. Divisions received engineer companies and other support units from their higher headquarters. The 10th Division was again renamed the 10th Infantry Division and lost the 77th Infantry Brigade to the 10th Reserve Division. Its initial wartime organization was as follows:

- 19. Infanterie-Brigade
  - Grenadier-Regiment Graf Kleist von Nollendorf (1. Westpreußisches) Nr. 6
  - Infanterie-Regiment Graf Kirchbach (1. Niederschlesisches) Nr. 46
- 20.Infanterie-Brigade
  - Infanterie-Regiment König Ludwig III von Bayern (2. Niederschlesisches) Nr. 47
  - 3. Niederschlesisches Infanterie-Regiment Nr. 50
- Regiment Königs-Jäger zu Pferde Nr. 1
- 10. Feldartillerie-Brigade
  - 1. Posensches Feldartillerie-Regiment Nr. 20
  - 2. Posensches Feldartillerie-Regiment Nr. 56
- 2.Kompanie/Niederschlesisches Pionier-Bataillon Nr. 5
- 3.Kompanie/Niederschlesisches Pionier-Bataillon Nr. 5

== Late World War I organization ==
Divisions underwent many changes during the war, with regiments moving from division to division, and some being destroyed and rebuilt. During the war, most divisions became triangular - one infantry brigade with three infantry regiments rather than two infantry brigades of two regiments (a "square division"). An artillery commander replaced the artillery brigade headquarters, the cavalry was further reduced, the engineer contingent was increased, and a divisional signals command was created. The 10th Infantry Division's order of battle on May 3, 1918, was as follows:

- 20. Infanterie-Brigade:
  - Grenadier-Regiment Graf Kleist von Nollendorf (1. Westpreußisches) Nr. 6
  - Infanterie-Regiment König Ludwig III von Bayern (2. Niederschlesisches) Nr. 47
  - Infanterie-Regiment Nr. 398
  - Maschinengewehr-Scharfschützen-Abteilung Nr. 17
- 3.Eskadron/Regiment Königs-Jäger zu Pferde Nr. 1
- Artillerie-Kommandeur 10
  - 2. Posensches Feldartillerie-Regiment Nr. 56
  - II.Bataillon/1. Westpreußisches Fußartillerie-Regiment Nr. 11
- Niederschlesisches Pionier-Bataillon Nr. 5
- Divisions-Nachrichten-Kommandeur 10
