= Gustav von der Mülbe =

Gustav von der Mülbe (11 December 1831 – 12 February 1917) was a Prussian Generalleutnant.

Mülbe was born in Braunschweig in the Duchy of Brunswick. He was the son of Friedrich von der Mülbe (1806–1859) and Agnes, née von Bothmer (1804–1841). In Liegnitz on 27 June 1869, Mülbe married Eleonore von Tschirschky (1843–1915); the couple had three daughters. Mülbe died in Erfurt.
