= Dolany (Náchod District) =

- Municipality
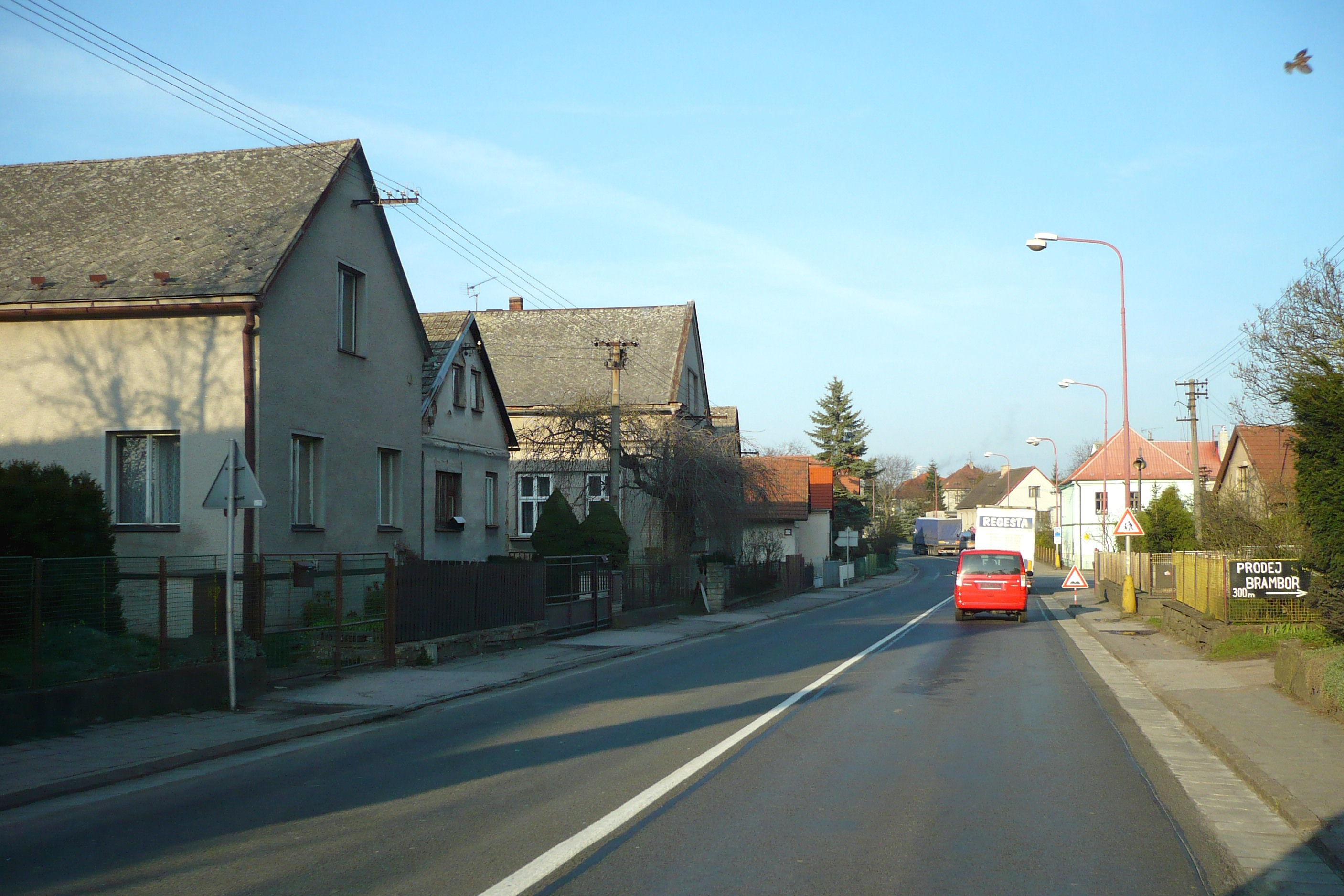
- Main road

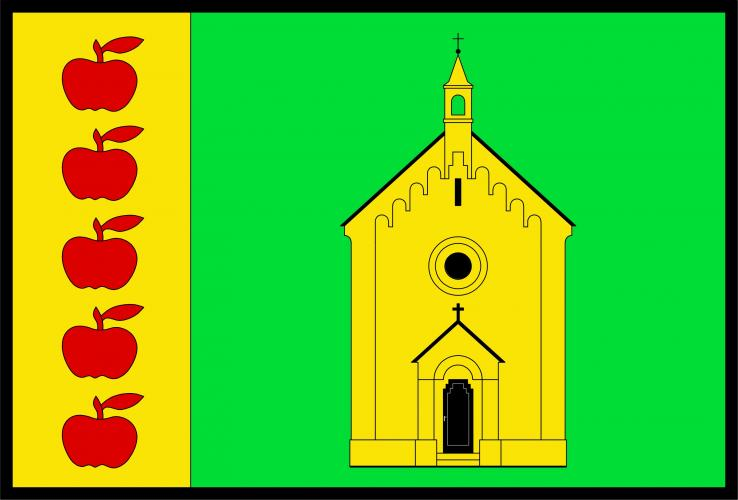
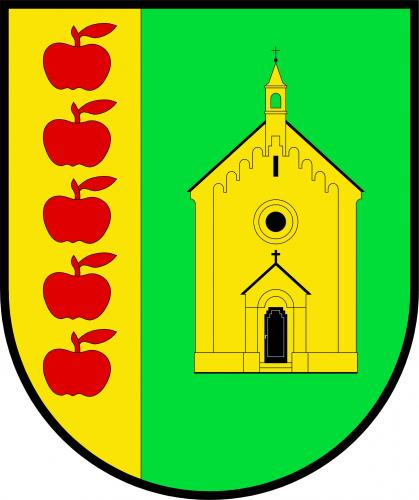
- Flag Coat of arms

- Location in the Czech Republic
- Coordinates: 50°22′48″N 15°57′41″E
- Country: Czech Republic
- Region: Hradec Králové
- District: Náchod
- First mentioned: 1654

Area
  - Total: 16.78 km^{2} (6.48 sq mi)
- Elevation: 274 m (899 ft)

Population (2026-01-01)
  - Total: 721
  - Density: 43.0/km^{2} (111/sq mi)
- Time zone: UTC+1 (CET)
  - Summer (DST): UTC+2 (CEST)
- Postal codes: 552 03, 552 04
- Website: www.dolany-na.cz

Dolany is a municipality and village in Náchod District in the Hradec Králové Region of the Czech Republic. It has about 700 inhabitants.

== Administrative division ==
Dolany consists of five municipal parts (in brackets population according to the 2021 census):

- Dolany (232)
- Čáslavky (158)
- Krabčice (65)
- Sebuč (36)
- Svinišťany (158)

== Etymology ==
The name Dolany is derived from the Czech word důl (in Old Czech written as dól), i.e. 'valley'.

== Demographics ==
Historical population
Year	Pop.	±%
1869	1,275	—
1880	1,341	+5.2%
1890	1,229	−8.4%
1900	1,148	−6.6%
1910	1,145	−0.3%
1921	1,058	−7.6%
1930	1,020	−3.6%
1950	692	−32.2%
1961	703	+1.6%
1970	766	+9.0%
1980	716	−6.5%
1991	650	−9.2%
2001	631	−2.9%
2011	587	−7.0%
2021	649	+10.6%
Source: Censuses
