= V Corps (German Empire) =

V Army Corps V. Armee-Korps
- Flag of the Staff of a Generalkommando (1871–1918)
- Active: 1815–1919
- Country: Prussia / German Empire
- Type: Corps
- Size: Approximately 44,000 (on mobilisation in 1914)
- Garrison/HQ: Posen/Seeckt Straße 1
- Shoulder strap piping: Yellow
- Engagements: Austro-Prussian War Battle of Königgrätz Franco-Prussian War Battle of Wissembourg (1870) Battle of Wörth (1870) Battle of Sedan Siege of Paris World War I Battle of the Frontiers

The V Army Corps / V AK (German: V. Armee-Korps) was a corps level command of the Prussian and then the Imperial German Armies from the 19th century to World War I.

Originating in 1815 as the General Command for the Grand Duchy of Posen (later called the Province of Posen) with headquarters in Posen. Its catchment area included the Regierungsbezirk (administrative district) Posen and Regierungsbezirk Liegnitz from the Province of Silesia.

The Corps served in the Austro-Prussian War. During the Franco-Prussian War it was assigned to the 3rd Army.

In peacetime the Corps was assigned to the VIII Army Inspectorate but joined the 5th Army at the start of the First World War. It was still in existence at the end of the war in Armee-Abteilung C, Heeresgruppe Gallwitz on the Western Front. The Corps was disbanded with the demobilisation of the German Army after World War I.

== Austro-Prussian War ==
V Corps fought in the Austro-Prussian War in 1866, seeing action in the Battle of Königgrätz.

== Franco-Prussian War ==
During the Franco-Prussian War the Corps joined the 3rd Army. It saw action in the opening battles of Weissenburg and Wörth, in the Battle of Sedan and in the Siege of Paris.

== Peacetime organisation ==
The 25 peacetime Corps of the German Army (Guards, I - XXI, I - III Bavarian) had a reasonably standardised organisation. Each consisted of two divisions with usually two infantry brigades, one field artillery brigade and a cavalry brigade each. Each brigade normally consisted of two regiments of the appropriate type, so each Corps normally commanded 8 infantry, 4 field artillery and 4 cavalry regiments. There were exceptions to this rule:

V, VI, VII, IX and XIV Corps each had a 5th infantry brigade (so 10 infantry regiments)
II, XIII, XVIII and XXI Corps had a 9th infantry regiment
I, VI and XVI Corps had a 3rd cavalry brigade (so 6 cavalry regiments)
the Guards Corps had 11 infantry regiments (in 5 brigades) and 8 cavalry regiments (in 4 brigades).

Each Corps also directly controlled a number of other units. This could include one or more

Foot Artillery Regiment
Jäger Battalion
Pioneer Battalion
Train Battalion

Peacetime organization of the Corps
Corps	Division	Brigade	Units	Garrison
V Corps	9th Division	17th Infantry Brigade	19th (2nd Posen) Infantry "von Coubière"	Görlitz, II Bn at Lauban
V Corps	9th Division	17th Infantry Brigade	58th (3rd Posen) Infantry	Glogau, III Bn at Fraustadt
V Corps	9th Division	18th Infantry Brigade	7th (2nd West Prussian) Grenadiers "King William I"	Liegnitz
V Corps	9th Division	18th Infantry Brigade	154th (5th Lower Silesian) Infantry	Jauer, III Bn at Striegau
V Corps	9th Division	9th Field Artillery Brigade	5th (1st Lower Silesian) Field Artillery "von Podbielski"	Sprottau, Sagan
V Corps	9th Division	9th Field Artillery Brigade	41st (2nd Lower Silesian) Field Artillery	Glogau
V Corps	9th Division	9th Cavalry Brigade	4th (1st Silesian) Dragoons "von Bredow"	Lüben
V Corps	9th Division	9th Cavalry Brigade	10th (Posen) Uhlans "Prince August of Württemberg"	Züllichau
V Corps	10th Division	19th Infantry Brigade	6th (1st West Prussian) Grenadiers "Count Kleist von Nollendorf"	Posen
V Corps	10th Division	19th Infantry Brigade	46th (1st Lower Silesian) Infantry "Count Kirchbach"	Posen, III Bn at Wreschen
V Corps	10th Division	20th Infantry Brigade	47th (2nd Lower Silesian) Infantry "King Ludwig III of Bavaria"	Posen, II Bn at Schrimm
V Corps	10th Division	20th Infantry Brigade	50th (3rd Lower Silesian) Infantry	Rawitsch, III Bn at Lissa
V Corps	10th Division	77th Infantry Brigade	37th (West Prussian) Fusiliers "von Steinmetz"	Krotoschin
V Corps	10th Division	77th Infantry Brigade	155th (7th West Prussian) Infantry	Ostrowo, III Bn at Pleschen
V Corps	10th Division	10th Field Artillery Brigade	20th (1st Posen) Field Artillery	Posen
V Corps	10th Division	10th Field Artillery Brigade	56th (2nd Posen) Field Artillery	Lissa
V Corps	10th Division	10th Cavalry Brigade	1st (West Prussian) Uhlans "Emperor Alexander III of Russia"	Militsch, Ostrowo
V Corps	10th Division	10th Cavalry Brigade	1st Jäger zu Pferde	Posen
V Corps	Corps Troops		5th (1st Silesian) Jäger Battalion "von Neumann"	Hirschberg
V Corps	Corps Troops		6th Fortress Machine Gun Abteilung	Posen
V Corps	Corps Troops		5th (Lower Silesian) Foot Artillery	Posen
V Corps	Corps Troops		5th (Lower Silesian) Pioneer Battalion	Glogau
V Corps	Corps Troops		29th (Posen) (Fortress-) Pioneer Battalion	Posen
V Corps	Corps Troops		8th Fortress Telephone Company	Posen
V Corps	Corps Troops		2nd Flying Battalion	Posen, Graudenz, Königsberg
V Corps	Corps Troops		5th (Lower Silesian) Train Battalion	Posen
V Corps	Posen Defence Command (Landwehr-Inspektion)			Posen

== World War I ==
=== Organisation on mobilisation ===
On mobilization on 2 August 1914 the Corps was restructured. 9th Cavalry Brigade was withdrawn to form part of the 5th Cavalry Division and the 10th Cavalry Brigade was broken up and its regiments assigned to the divisions as reconnaissance units. 77th Infantry Brigade was assigned to the 10th Reserve Division with the V Reserve Corps. Divisions received engineer companies and other support units from the Corps headquarters. In summary, V Corps mobilised with 25 infantry battalions, 9 machine gun companies (54 machine guns), 8 cavalry squadrons, 24 field artillery batteries (144 guns), 4 heavy artillery batteries (16 guns), 3 pioneer companies and an aviation detachment.

Initial wartime organization of the Corps
Corps	Division	Brigade	Units
V Corps	9th Division	17th Infantry Brigade	19th Infantry Regiment
V Corps	9th Division	17th Infantry Brigade	58th Infantry Regiment
V Corps	9th Division	18th Infantry Brigade	7th Grenadier Regiment
V Corps	9th Division	18th Infantry Brigade	154th Infantry Regiment
V Corps	9th Division	18th Infantry Brigade	5th Jäger Battalion
V Corps	9th Division	9th Field Artillery Brigade	5th Field Artillery Regiment
V Corps	9th Division	9th Field Artillery Brigade	41st Field Artillery Regiment
V Corps	9th Division		1st Uhlan Regiment
V Corps	9th Division		1st Company, 5th Pioneer Battalion
V Corps	9th Division		9th Divisional Pontoon Train
V Corps	9th Division		1st Medical Company
V Corps	9th Division		3rd Medical Company
V Corps	10th Division	19th Infantry Brigade	6th Grenadier Regiment
V Corps	10th Division	19th Infantry Brigade	46th Infantry Regiment
V Corps	10th Division	20th Infantry Brigade	47th Infantry Regiment
V Corps	10th Division	20th Infantry Brigade	50th Infantry Regiment
V Corps	10th Division	10th Field Artillery Brigade	20th Field Artillery Regiment
V Corps	10th Division	10th Field Artillery Brigade	56th Field Artillery Regiment
V Corps	10th Division		1st Jäger zu Pferde
V Corps	10th Division		2nd Company, 5th Pioneer Battalion
V Corps	10th Division		3rd Company, 5th Pioneer Battalion
V Corps	10th Division		10th Divisional Pontoon Train
V Corps	10th Division		2nd Medical Company
V Corps	Corps Troops		I Battalion, 5th Foot Artillery Regiment
V Corps	Corps Troops		19th Aviation Detachment
V Corps	Corps Troops		5th Corps Pontoon Train
V Corps	Corps Troops		5th Telephone Detachment
V Corps	Corps Troops		5th Pioneer Searchlight Section
V Corps	Corps Troops		Munition Trains and Columns corresponding to II Corps

=== Combat chronicle ===
On mobilisation, V Corps was assigned to the 5th Army forming part of centre of the forces for the Schlieffen Plan offensive in August 1914 on the Western Front.

It was still in existence at the end of the war in Armee-Abteilung C, Heeresgruppe Gallwitz on the Western Front.

== Commanders ==
The V Corps had the following commanders during its existence:

From	Rank	Name
15 Match 1815		Heinrich Ludwig von Thümen
3 April 1820		Friedrich von Roeder
30 March 1832	General der Infanterie	Karl von Grolman
21 September 1843	General der Kavallerie	Friedrich August Peter von Colomb
13 May 1848		Friedrich Wilhelm von Brünneck
4 November 1851		Wilhelm von Tietzen und Hennig
15 August 1856	General der Kavallerie	Franz Graf von Waldersee
15 August 1864	General der Infanterie	Karl Friedrich von Steinmetz
18 July 1870	General der Infanterie	Hugo von Kirchbach
3 February 1880	General der Infanterie	Alexander August Wilhelm von Pape
18 October 1881	General der Infanterie	Gustav von Stiehle
22 March 1886	General der Kavallerie	Gustav Hermann von Alvensleben
23 November 1886	Generalleutnant	Oskar Freiherr von Meerscheidt-Hüllessem
19 September 1888	Generalleutnant	Franz Freiherr von Hilgers
27 January 1890	Generalleutnant	Richard von Seeckt
27 January 1897	General der Infanterie	August von Bomsdorff
4 April 1899	General der Infanterie	Ferdinand von Stülpnagel
13 June 1906	General der Infanterie	Alexander von Kluck
11 September 1907	General der Infanterie	Günther von Kirchbach
3 April 1911	General der Infanterie	Hermann von Strantz
1 September 1914	Generalleutnant	Robert Kosch (deputising for von Strantz)
9 October 1914		Adolf von Oven (deputising for von Strantz)
13 May 1915		Eduard von Below (deputising for von Strantz)
2 February 1917	General der Infanterie	Eduard von Below
2 January 1919	General der Infanterie	Georg Wichura

== See also ==
- Franco-Prussian War order of battle
- German Army order of battle (1914)
- German Army order of battle, Western Front (1918)
- List of Imperial German infantry regiments
- List of Imperial German artillery regiments
- List of Imperial German cavalry regiments
- Poznań Fortress

== Bibliography ==
- Cron, Hermann (2002). Imperial German Army 1914-18: Organisation, Structure, Orders-of-Battle [first published: 1937]. Helion & Co. ISBN 1-874622-70-1.
- Ellis, John; Cox, Michael (1993). The World War I Databook. Aurum Press Ltd. ISBN 1-85410-766-6.
- Haythornthwaite, Philip J. (1996). The World War One Source Book. Arms and Armour. ISBN 1-85409-351-7.
- Histories of Two Hundred and Fifty-One Divisions of the German Army which Participated in the War (1914–1918), compiled from records of Intelligence section of the General Staff, American Expeditionary Forces, at General Headquarters, Chaumont, France 1919. The London Stamp Exchange Ltd. 1989 [1920]. ISBN 0-948130-87-3.
- The German Forces in the Field; 7th Revision, 11th November 1918; Compiled by the General Staff, War Office. Imperial War Museum, London and the Battery Press. 1995 [1918]. ISBN 978-1-870423-95-3.
