= Hugo von Kirchbach =

German general

Hugo Ewald Graf von Kirchbach
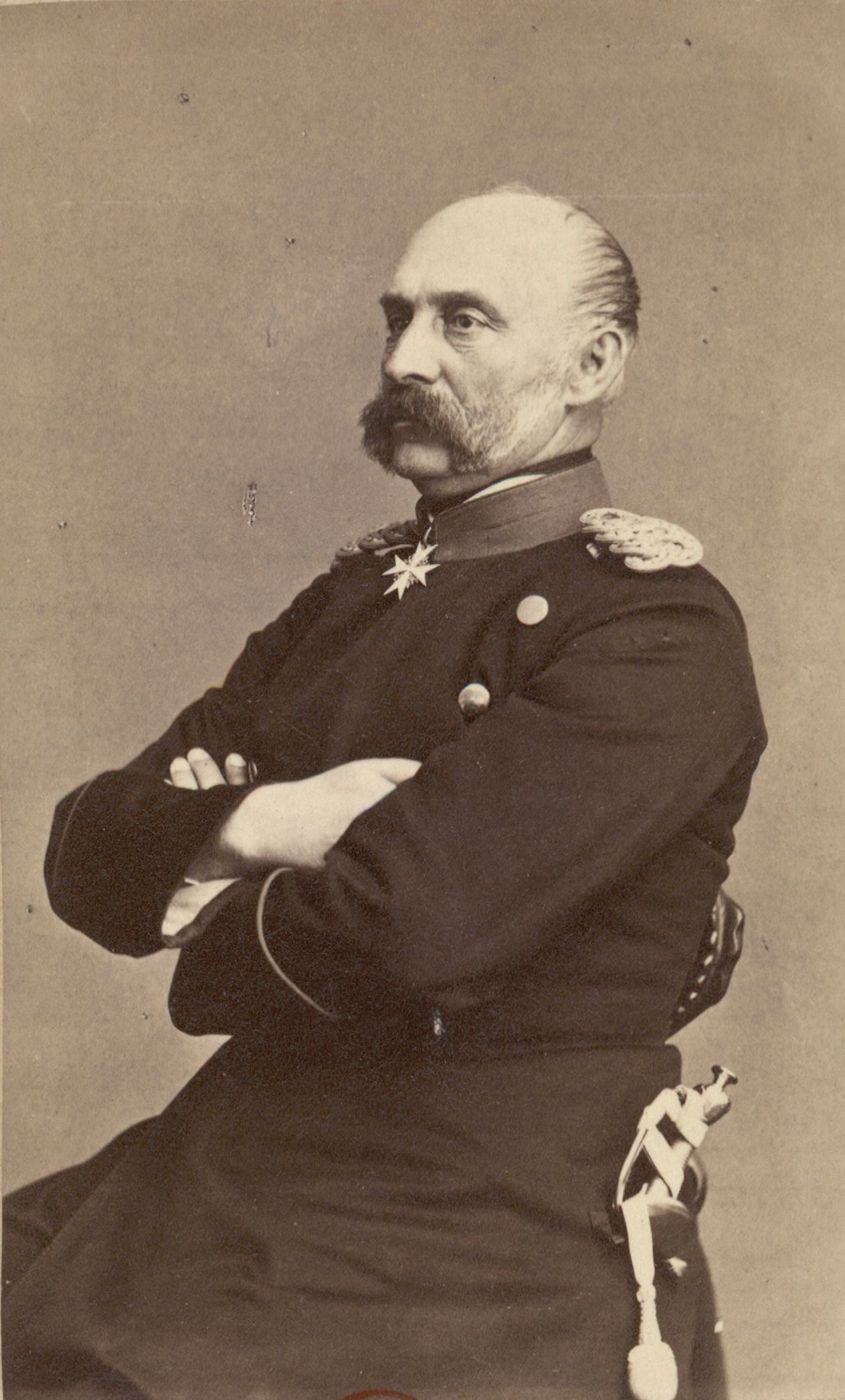
- Born: 23 May 1809; Neumarkt, Silesia
- Died: 16 October 1887 (aged 78); Niesky, Oberlausitz
- Relatives: Günther von Kirchbach
- Military career
- Allegiance: Kingdom of Prussia; German Empire
- Branch: Prussian Army; Imperial German Army
- Rank: General of the Infantry
- Commands: V Corps
- Conflicts: Second Schleswig War; Austro-Prussian War; Franco-Prussian War
- Awards: Pour le Mérite with Oak Leaves; Military Order of Max Joseph; Military Merit Order

Hugo Ewald Graf von Kirchbach (23 May 1809 – 26 October 1887) was a Prussian general who commanded the Prussian V Corps during the Franco-Prussian War.

== Biography ==
He was born in 1809 at Neumarkt in Silesia, to the Saxon noble family of Kirchbach. His father, Franz Karl Helmuth von Kirchbach, was a captain in the Prussian Army, serving as an adjutant to Major General Michael Heinrich von Losthin in the 1813 Campaign during the Napoleonic Wars.

First entering the cadet school in 1824, von Kirchbach was named an ensign in the Regiment Fürst Leopold von Anhalt-Dessau in 1826, before being promoted to sub-lieutenant a year later. From 1831 to 1834 he studied at the Prussian Military Academy, which was a prerequisite to joining the General Staff. In 1838 he joined the Prussian General Staff's topography division. He was promoted to lieutenant in 1840, captain in 1845 and major in 1850. From 1855 to 1858 he was a divisional chief on the General Staff. In 1859 von Kirchbach became commander of the 36th Infantry Regiment. Before being promoted to major general in 1863, von Kirchbach served as the chief of staff of the 3rd Army corps in Berlin.

During the Second Schleswig War von Kirchbach was given command of the 21st Infantry brigade. At the start of the Austro-Prussian War in 1866 von Kirchbach was promoted to lieutenant general and named the commander of the 10th Infantry division. He distinguished himself in the battle of Nachod, and in engagements at Skalitz and Schweinschädel. For these actions he was awarded the Pour le Mérite. His division was not engaged at Königgrätz

When the Franco-Prussian War erupted in 1870 von Kirchbach was promoted to General der Infanterie and appointed commander of the Prussian V Corps. He played a prominent role in the early battles of the war at Wissembourg and Wörth. At Sedan von Kirchbach and his V Corps were tasked with closing the ring on the northern side around the French Army of Châlons trapped at Sedan. During the siege of Paris, V Corps occupied positions to the southwest of the city. Von Kirchbach was able to repel all French attempts to break through his positions at Mont Valerien, for which he was awarded the oak leaves to his Pour le Mérite. In February 1871, the V Corps was sent to Orléans and in March to Vesoul.

In 1872 he was given 100.000 thalers and an estate in Niesky. In 1880 von Kirchbach was granted the title of Count. Hugo von Kirchbach died in 1887 in Niesky, Oberlausitz.

== Marriage and issue ==
Von Kirchbach married Anna Karoline Davide Schwartz (1826–1905) at Magdeburg on 11 March 1844. Their son, Günther, served as a colonel general during the First World War.

== Honours and awards ==
- Kingdom of Prussia:
  - Knight of the Royal Order of the Crown, 3rd Class, 18 October 1861
  - Knight of Honour of the Johanniter Order, 1863; Knight of Justice, 1869
  - Service Award Cross
  - Pour le Mérite (military), 20 September 1866; with Oak Leaves, 16 February 1871
  - Iron Cross (1870), 1st Class with 2nd Class on Black Band
  - Grand Cross of the Order of the Red Eagle, with Oak Leaves, 27 March 1873
  - Knight of the Order of the Black Eagle, 18 September 1875; with Collar, 1876
- Duchy of Anhalt: Grand Cross of the House Order of Albert the Bear, 1877
- Kingdom of Bavaria: Commander of the Military Order of Max Joseph, 18 October 1870
- Mecklenburg-Schwerin: Military Merit Cross, 1st Class
- Russian Empire:
  - Knight of the Order of St. George, 3rd Class, 27 December 1870
  - Knight of the Order of St. Alexander Nevsky, January 1874
- Saxe-Weimar-Eisenach: Knight of the Order of the White Falcon, 1st Class, 24 November 1846
- Kingdom of Saxony: Grand Cross of the Albert Order, with War Decoration, 1871
- Schaumburg-Lippe: Military Merit Medal with Swords
- Württemberg: Grand Cross of the Military Merit Order, 30 December 1870
