= 1st King's Mounted Rifles =

Military unit

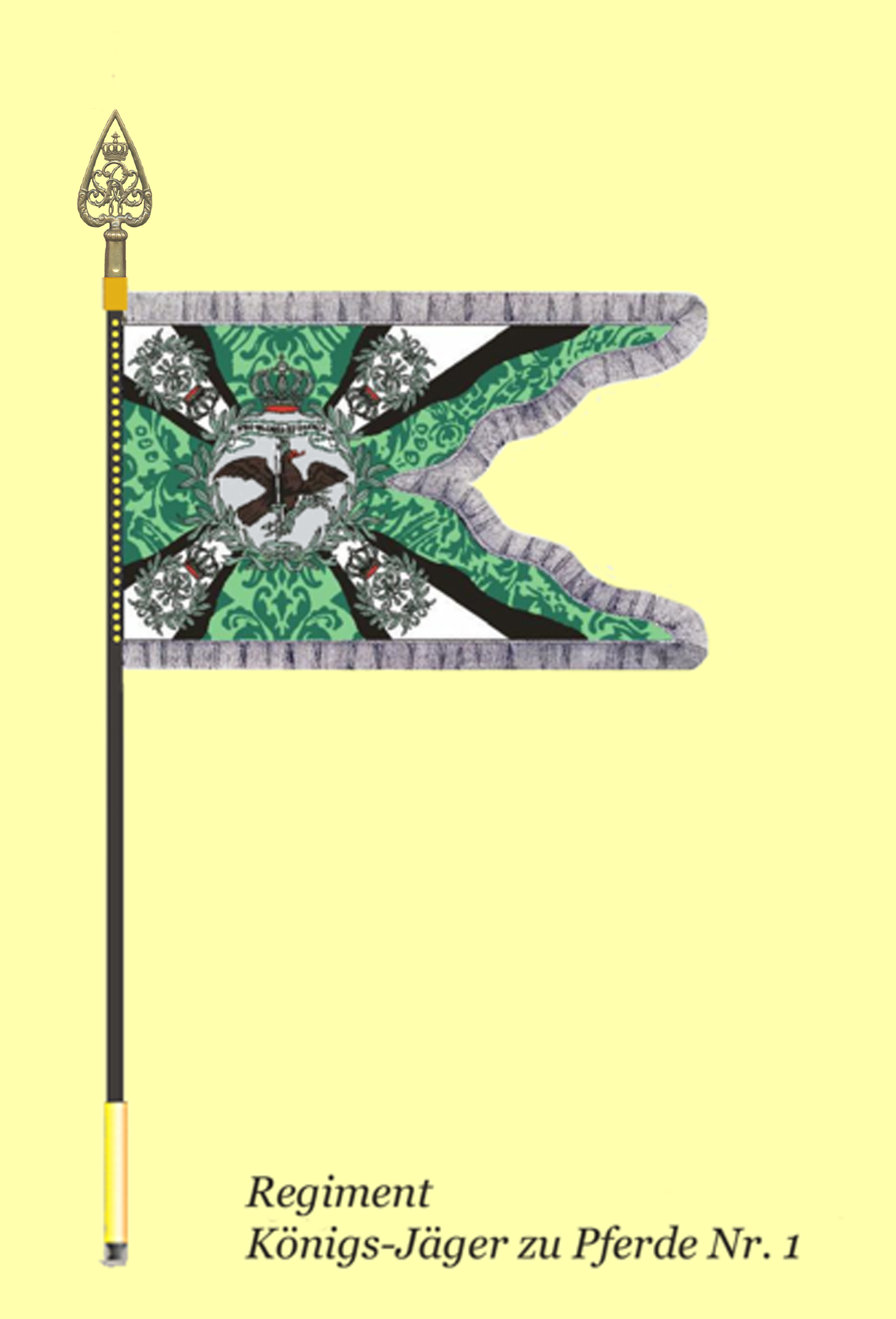
Colors of the Prussian 1st Regiment The Kings Mounted Rifles.

The 1st King's Mounted Rifles were a light cavalry regiment of the Royal Prussian Army from 1901 to 1918. When the Imperial German Army was reorganized as the Reichsheer, 'A Squadron'/'10th Horse' became bearer of the regiment's tradition.

The 1st King's Mounted Rifles belonged to the V Army Corps and was garrisoned in Posen. When the regiment was mobilized in 1914, it formed 10th Cavalry Brigade. Colonel-in-Chief of the regiment was Wilhelm II, German Emperor who was also the King of Prussia, hence the title King's.

== See also ==
- List of Imperial German cavalry regiments
