= Battle of Wissembourg (1870) =

Part of the Franco-Prussian War

Coordinates: 49°01′N 7°57′E

- Part of the Franco-Prussian War
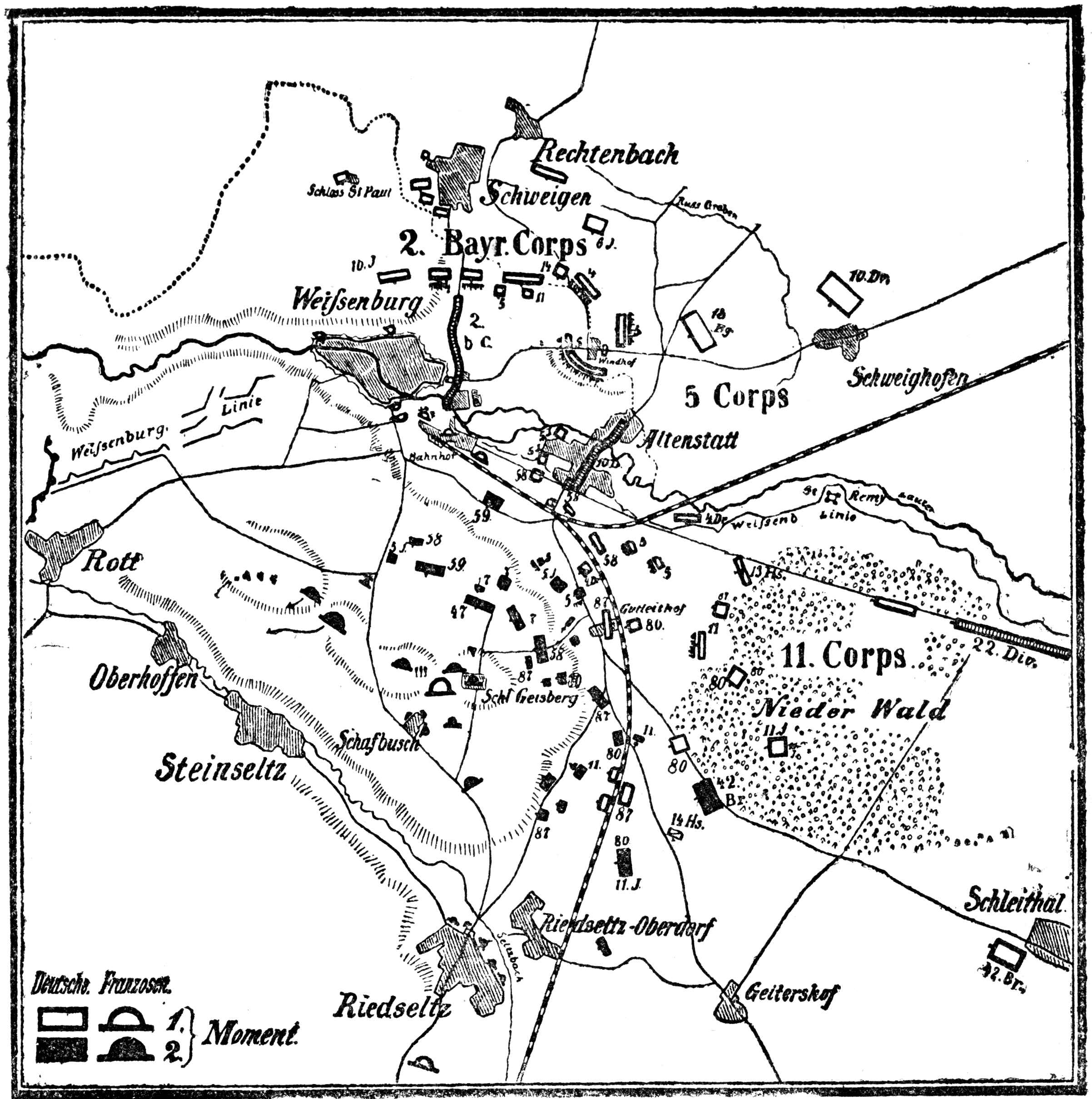
- Map of the Battle of Wissembourg
| Date | 4 August 1870 |
| Location | Wissembourg, France |
| Result | German victory |

Belligerents
| Prussia; Baden; Bavaria (Kingdom of Württemberg) Württemberg | (Second French Empire) France |

Commanders and leaders
| (Kingdom of Prussia) Friedrich Wilhelm (Kingdom of Prussia) Hugo von Kirchbach (Kingdom of Bavaria) Jakob von Hartmann | (Second French Empire) Abel Douay † (Second French Empire) Jean Pellé |

Strength
| 25,000; 144 guns | 6,000; 12 guns |

Casualties and losses
| 1,551 killed, wounded or missing | 1,600 killed or wounded 700 captured |
- Grand Est Region

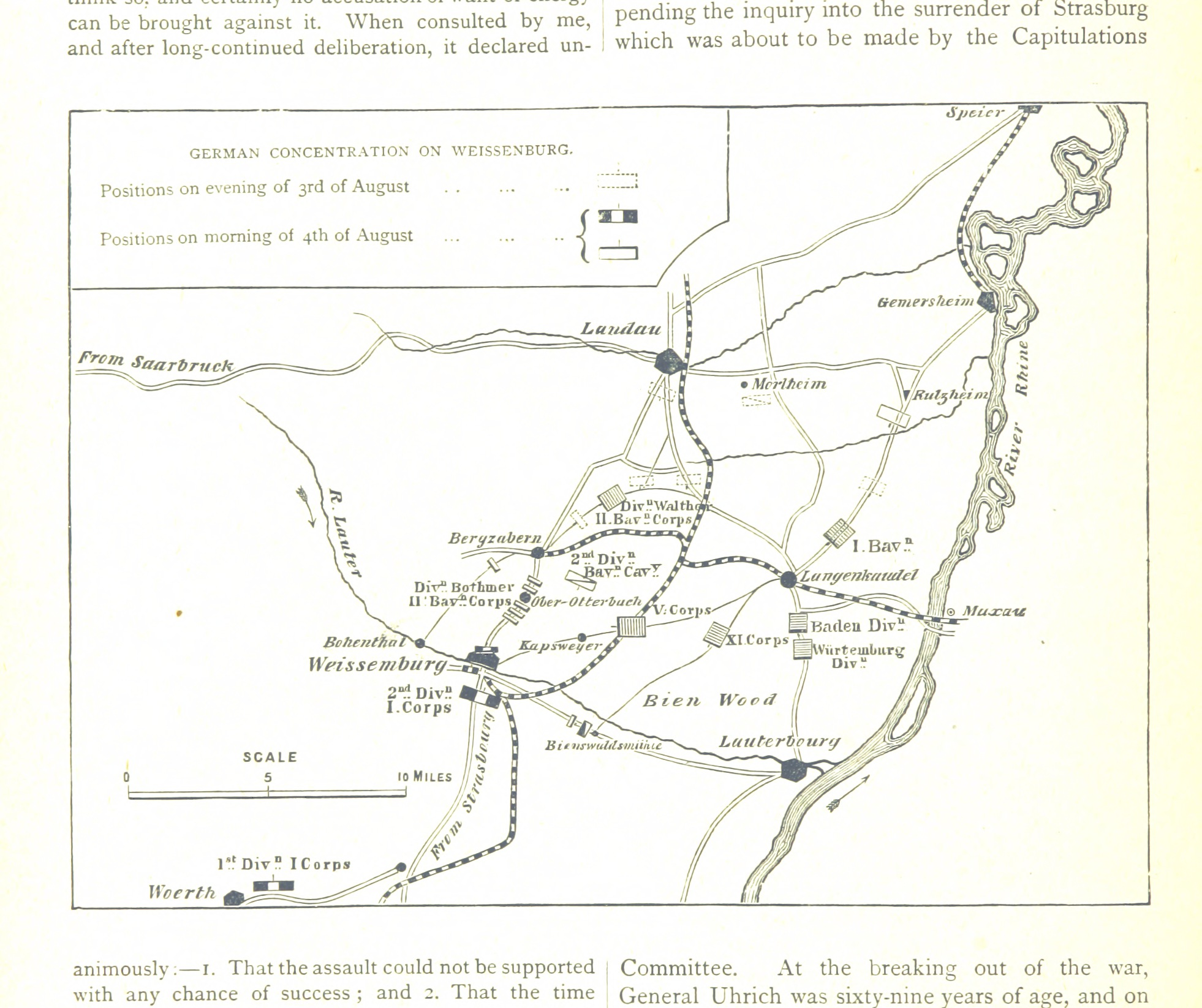
German concentration on Wissemburg

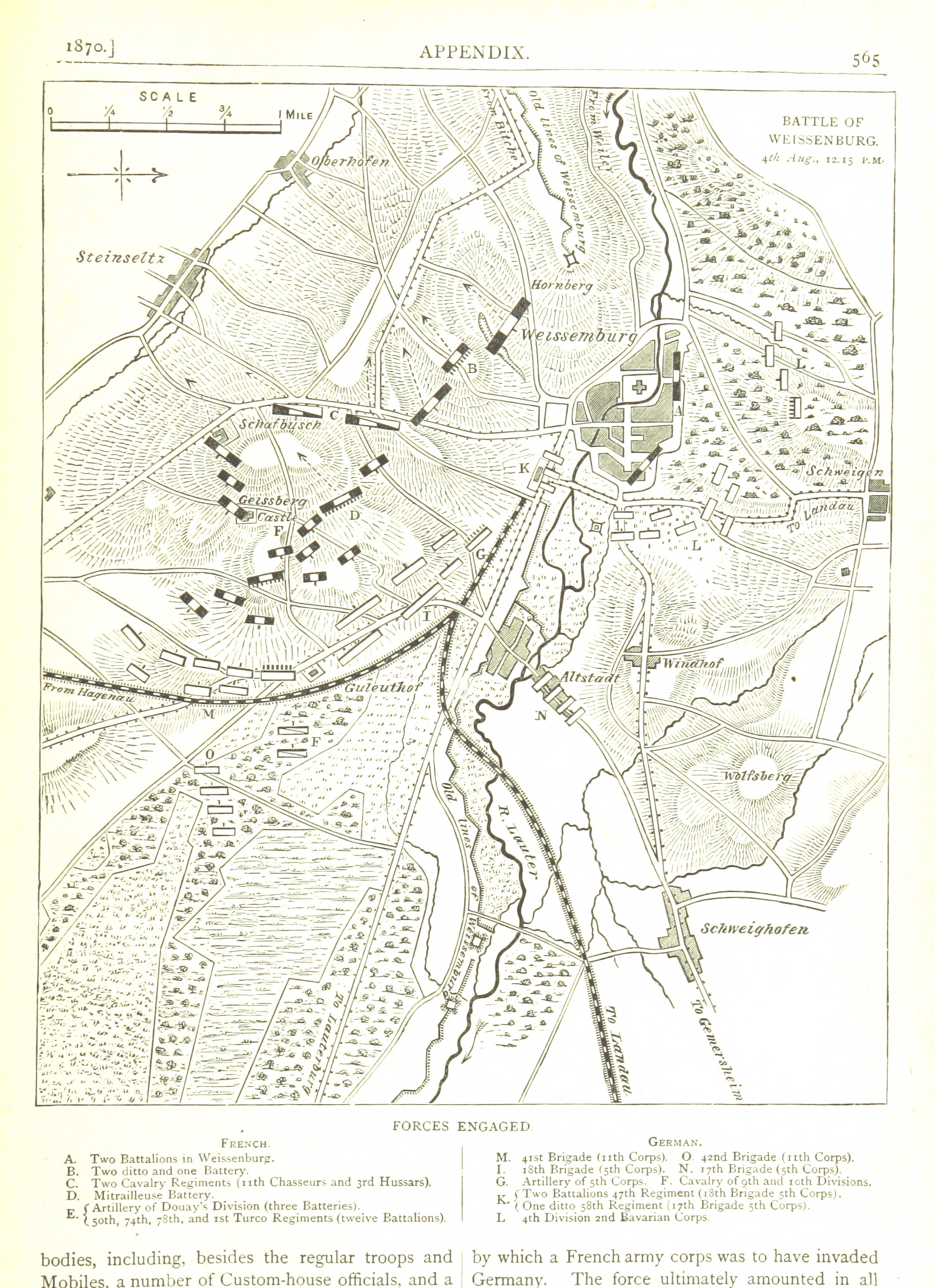
Situation 12.15 PM

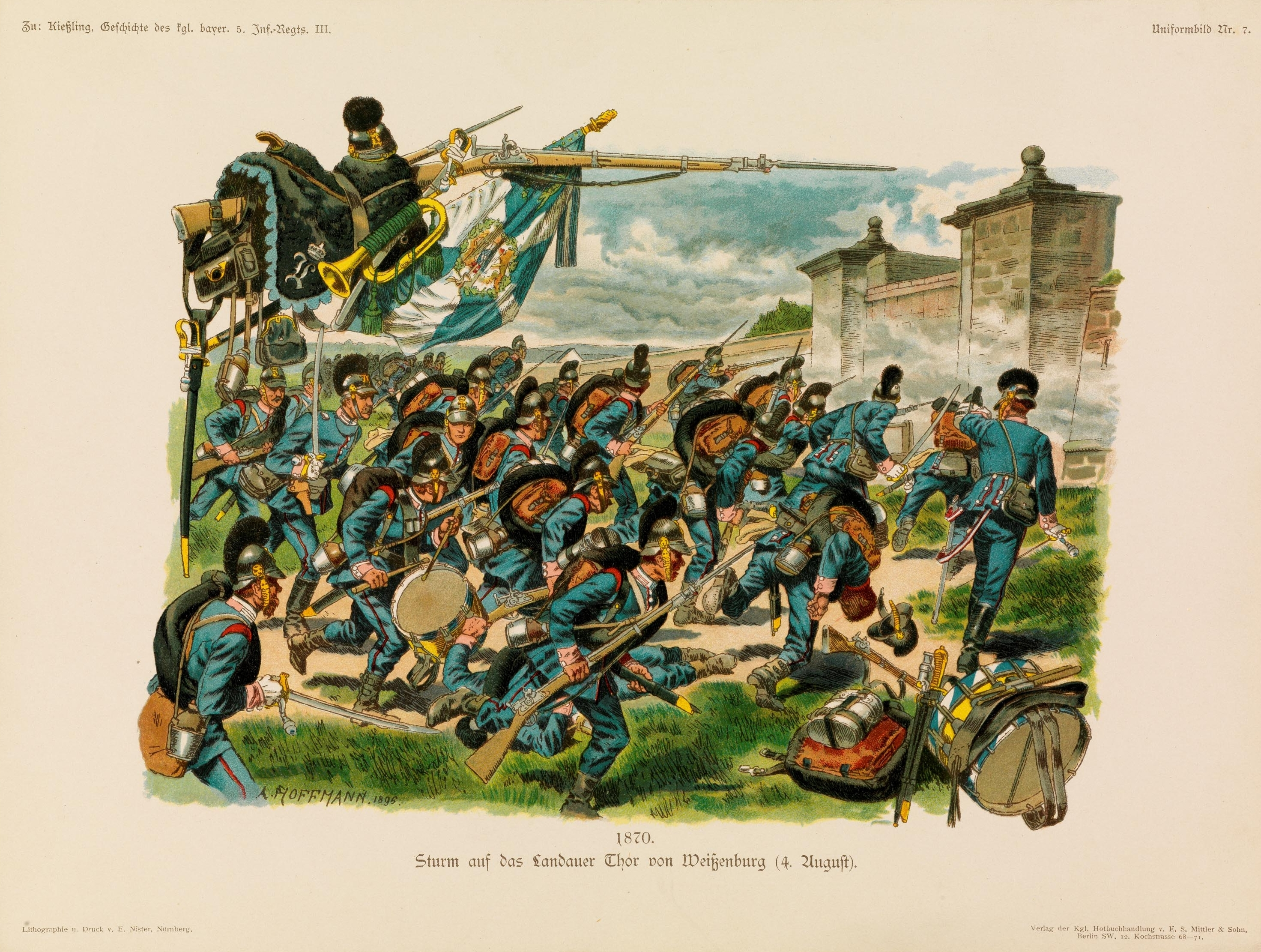
Illustration of the 5th Royal Bavarian Regiment at the battle

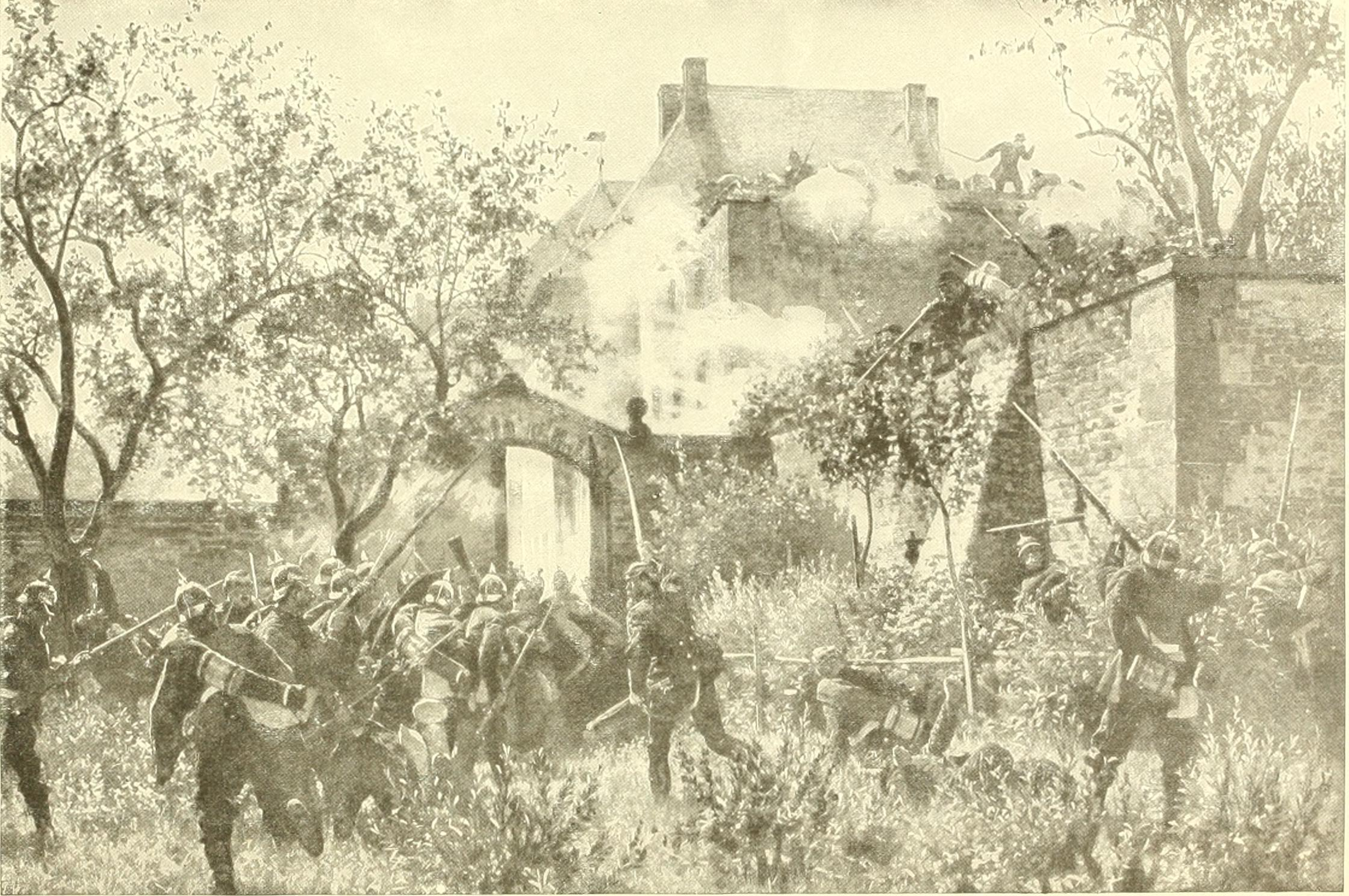
Illustration of the storming of the Geissburg

The Battle of Wissembourg or Battle of Weissenburg, (Note: French: Bataille de Wissembourg, German: Schlacht bei Weißenburg) the first of the Franco-Prussian War, was joined when three German army corps surprised the small French garrison at Wissembourg on 4 August 1870. (Note: Wissembourg is from the French spelling and Weissenburg from the German: Weißenburg.) The defenders, greatly outnumbered, fought stubbornly "especially considering they were surprised and greatly outnumbered, that the French sustained their old renown as fighting men and that the first defeat, although severe, reflected no discredit on the soldiers of the 1st Corps." The fall of Wissembourg allowed the Prussian army to move into France and compelled Marshal Patrice MacMahon to give battle, and suffer defeat, at the Battle of Wörth on 6 August.

== Background ==
In June 1870 Napoleon III had moved the French army into Lorraine and occupied Saarbrücken on 2 August. Napoleon wished to win a significant battle on German soil and ordered Marshal Patrice MacMahon to bring up the French I and V Corps. MacMahon's objective was to reach Wissembourg where he already had one division stationed under General Abel Douay. Once there he would concentrate his forces for a strike into Germany. The German III Army under Crown Prince Friedrich Wilhelm and his able Chief of Staff, General von Blumenthal, was already moving towards Wissembourg. Neither side was fully aware of the other's movements.

At the outbreak of war, General Ducrot, commanding the 6th French Division at Strasbourg, issued orders to withdraw the elements of his forces stationed at Wissembourg and Lauterbourg. The sub-prefect of Wissembourg protested this decision, not agreeing with Ducrot's decision to weaken the 6th division along the German frontier. General Douay's 2nd French Division set off for Haguenau 22 July, making it necessary to reoccupy Wissembourg to secure Douay's line of supply, a portion of his materiel being stored in the small frontier town.

In August, Marshal MacMahon concentrated his effectives at Haguenau with the object of warding off any attempt on the strategic Strasbourg—Haguenau—Bitche—Metz rail lines, and established the following positions: Ducrot's 1st Division broke camp on 4 August and established itself at Lembach in order to secure contact with General Failly's V Corps; Douay's 2nd Division reoccupied Wissembourg, Weiler and the nearby countryside, namely the soft hills by the Col du Pigeonnier. The 1st Cavalry Brigade would patrol the frontier east of Wissembourg up to Schleithal.

== Prelude ==
Auguste-Alexandre Ducrot's familiarity with the terrain earned him the responsibility of overseeing the deployment of the various units in the area, including General Abel Douay's 1st Division. Accordingly, he instructed Douay to rearrange his with an emphasis on securing the heights commanding the valley of the Lauter: the main emplacements were set up on the Geisberg plateau to the east and the Vogelsberg plateau on the western side, leaving a single battalion in the town of Wissembourg proper. Finally, Douay was to relieve the 96th Infantry Regiment in the village of Climbach. At this point Ducrot received gravely flawed intelligence. On the basis of reconnaissance performed by the colonel commanding the 96th Regiment, he did not believe the enemy present in enough strength to attempt any serious enterprise in the immediate future.

Upon learning from captured Prussian soldiers and a local area police chief, that the Prussian Crown Prince's Third Army was just 30 miles (50 km) from Saarbrücken near the town of Wissembourg, General Le Boeuf and Napoleon III decided to retreat to defensive positions. General Frossard, without instructions, hastily withdrew the elements of Army of the Rhine in Saarbrücken back to Spicheren and Forbach.

Marshal MacMahon, now closest to Wissembourg, spread his four divisions over 20 miles (30 km) to react to any Prussian invasion. This organization of forces was due to a lack of supplies, forcing each division to seek out basic provisions along with the representatives of the army supply arm that was supposed to aid them. What made a bad situation much worse was the conduct of Ducrot, commander of the 1st Division. He told Douay, commander of the 2nd Division, on 1 August, that "the information I have received makes me suppose that the enemy has no considerable forces very near his advance posts, and has no desire to take the offensive."

Two days later, he told MacMahon that he had not found "a single enemy post ... it looks to me as if the menace of the Bavarians is simply bluff." Even though Ducrot shrugged off the possibility of an attack by the Germans, MacMahon tried to warn the other divisions of his army, without success.

== Battle ==
The battle saw the unsupported division of General Douay of I Corps, with some attached cavalry, which was posted to watch the border, attacked in overwhelming but un-coordinated fashion by the German 3rd Army. During the day, elements of a Bavarian and two Prussian corps became engaged and were aided by Prussian artillery, which blasted holes in the defenses of the town. Douay held a very strong position initially, thanks to the accurate long-range fire of the Chassepots but his force was too thinly stretched to hold it. Douay was killed in the late morning when a caisson of the divisional mitrailleuse battery exploded near him; the encirclement of the town by the Prussians threatened the French avenue of retreat.

The fighting within the town had become extremely intense, becoming a door to door battle of survival. Despite a never-ending attack of Prussian infantry, the soldiers of the 2nd Division kept to their positions. The people of the town of Wissembourg finally surrendered to the Germans. The French troops who did not surrender retreated westward, leaving behind 1,000 dead and wounded and another 1,000 prisoners and all of their remaining ammunition. The final attack by the Prussian troops also cost c. 1,000 casualties. The German cavalry then failed to pursue the French and lost touch with them. The attackers had an initial superiority of numbers, a broad deployment which made envelopment highly likely but the effectiveness of French Chassepot rifle-fire inflicted costly repulses on infantry attacks, until the French infantry had been extensively bombarded by the Prussian artillery.

== Aftermath ==
The battle was a victory for the Germans and allowed them to invade France. Shortly after the battle the German III Army was on the move towards Wörth where they ran into the main body of MacMahon's army.

== Sources ==
- Clodfelter, M. (2008). Warfare and armed conflicts : a statistical encyclopedia of casualty and other figures, 1494-2007. Jefferson, North Carolina: McFarland. ISBN 978-0786433193.
- Hooper, G. (1887). The campaign of Sedan. London: Bell. OCLC 422215149.
- Howard, M. (1961). The Franco–Prussian War. London: Rupert Hart-Davis. ISBN 0-24663-587-8.
- Moltke, Field Marshal Count Helmuth von (1892). The Franco-German War of 1870. New York: Harper and Brothers.
- Wawro, G. (2002). Warfare and Society in Europe, 1792–1914. New York: Routledge. ISBN 0-20317-183-7.
- Wawro, G. (2003). The Franco–Prussian War: The German Conquest of France in 1870–1871. Cambridge: Cambridge University Press. ISBN 0-521-58436-1.
