= Tassiló Festetics de Tolna (Hungarian noble, born 1813) =

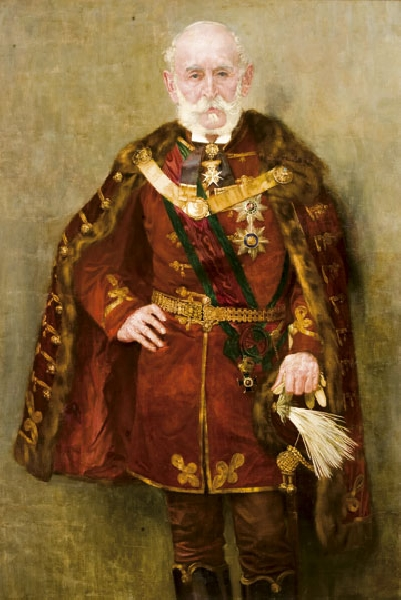

Tassilo Graf Festetics de Tolna (2 June 1813 – 7 February 1883) was a Royal Hungarian court official and an Austrian General der Kavallerie, who commanded the Austrian IV Army Corps during the Austro-Prussian War.

== Biography ==
Born in Vienna into the noble family Festetics de Tolna, Tassilo Festetics was the grandson of the agricultural pioneer György Festetics. In 1827 he joined the Chevauxlegers Regiment No. 2 as a second lieutenant. He served in the army until he left active service on 15 February 1846. Recalled, he took part in the suppression of the Kraków uprising and in the campaign in Italy in 1849. On 31 July 1849 he returned to active service as a lieutenant colonel and from September 1849 to July 1857 he commanded Hussar Regiment No. 7.

On 25 July 1857, he was promoted to major general, and on 3 April 1858 he received command of a brigade in the V Army Corps. He led his brigade in the Battle of Solferino. For his performance, he was awarded the Order of the Iron Crown 2nd Class. On 21 January 1864, he was promoted to Feldmarshall-Leutnant.

During the Austro-Prussian War of 1866, he received the command of the IV Army Corps, which was part of the North Army, and led it in the battle of Königgrätz, where he was wounded by shrapnel in the foot.

On 3 October 1866, he received the Grand Cross of the Order of Leopold and on 15 August 1869, he was awarded the Order of the Golden Fleece. On 20 April 1879 he was promoted to General der Kavallerie.

Tassilo Festetics de Tolna died on 7 February 1883 in Petrovardin.
