= Battle of Tannenberg (1914) order of battle =

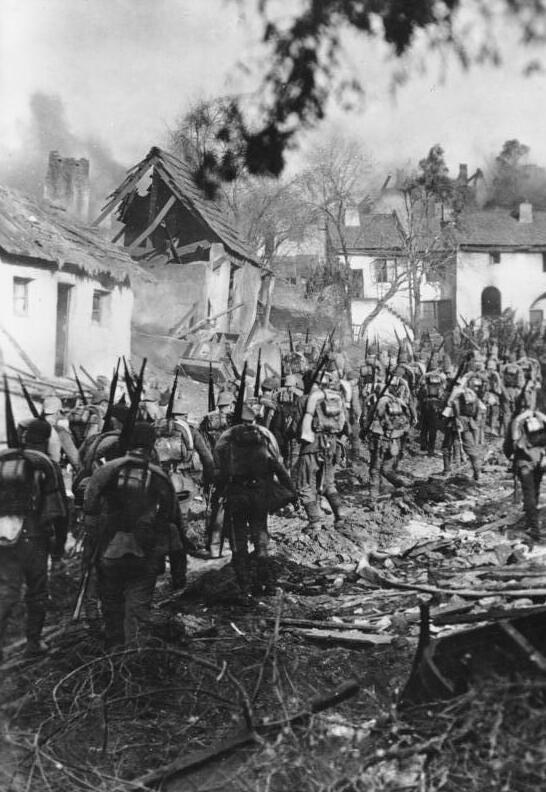
German infantry on the march, September 1914

This is the order of battle for both the Russian and German armies at the Battle of Tannenberg, August 17 to September 2, 1914.

== Russian Northwestern Front ==
General Yakov Zhilinsky, Front Commander (not present)

Maj. Gen. Sir Alfred Knox, British Military Attache (attached to 2nd Army)

=== First Army ===
General Paul von Rennenkampf, Commander

Lt. Gen. Gavriil Mileant, Chief of Staff

II Corps (transferred from the Second Army, 22 August) – General Sergei Scheidemann

26th Infantry Division

43rd Infantry Division

III Corps – General Nikolai Epanchin

25th Infantry Division

27th Infantry Division

IV Corps – General Eris Khan Sultan Giray Aliyev

30th Infantry Division

40th Infantry Division

XX Corps – General Vladimir Vasilyevich Smirnov

28th Infantry Division

29th Infantry Division

Unattached

56th Infantry Division

- 221st Roslav Infantry Regiment
- 222nd Krasnan Infantry Regiment
- 223rd Odoev Infantry Regiment
- 224th Yukhnov Infantry Regiment
- 73rd Artillery (Reserve) Brigade

5th Rifle Brigade

1st Guard Cavalry Division – Lt. Gen. Nikolai Kaznakov

- 1st Brigade
  - Chevalier Guard Regiment
  - Guard Cavalry Regiment
- 2nd Brigade
  - Guard Cuirassier Regiment of the Emperor
  - Guard Cuirassier Regiment of Empress Marie

2nd Guard Cavalry Division – Lt. Gen. Georgy Ottonovich Rauch

- 1st Brigade
  - Guard Horse Grenadier Regiment
  - Guard Ulan Regiment of the Empress
- 2nd Brigade
  - Guard Dragoon Regiment
  - Guard Hussar Regiment of the Emperor

1st Cavalry Division– Lt. Gen. Vasily Gurko

2nd Cavalry Division – Lt. Gen. Huseyn Khan Nakhchivanski

3rd Cavalry Division – Lt. Gen. Vladimir Belgard

1st Independent Cavalry Brigade

- 19th Dragoons
- 16th Hussars
- 3rd Horse Battery

1st Heavy Artillery Brigade

Organization of the Imperial Russian Army at the Battle of Tannenberg

=== Second Army ===
General Alexander Samsonov, Commander

Maj. Gen. Postowski, Chief of Staff

I Corps – General Artamanov, relieved on August 28

– Lt. Gen Alexander Alexandrovich Dushkevich

22nd Infantry Division

24th Infantry Division

VI Corps – General Alexander Blagoveshchensky

4th Infantry Division

16th Infantry Division

XIII Corps – Lt. Gen. Nikolai Klyuev

1st Infantry Division

36th Infantry Division

XV Corps – General Nikolai Martos

6th Infantry Division

8th Infantry Division

XXIII Corps – General Kyprian Kandratovich

3rd Guard Infantry Division

- 1st Brigade
  - Guard Regiment Lithuania
  - Guard Regiment Kexholm – Colonel Sirelius
- 2nd Brigade
  - Guard Regiment St. Petersburg
  - Guard Regiment Wolhyna

2nd Infantry Division

Unattached

1st Rifle Brigade

4th Cavalry Division – Lt. Gen. Anton Tolpygo

6th Cavalry Division – Lt. Gen. Vladimir Roop

15th Cavalry Division – Lt. Gen. Pavel Lyubomirov

2nd Heavy Artillery Brigade

== German Eighth Army ==
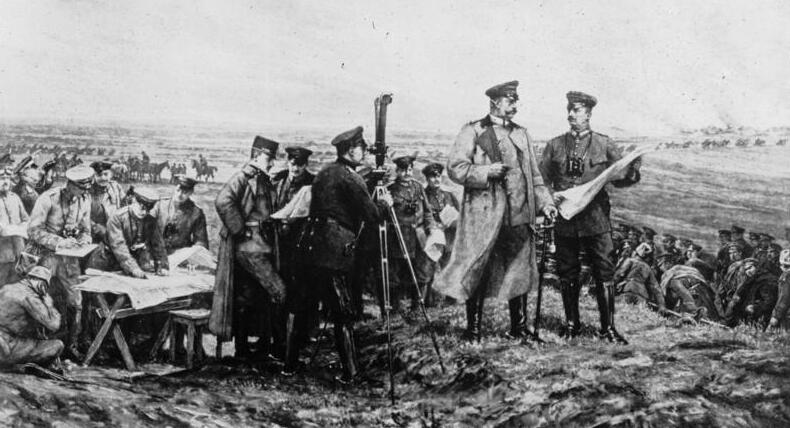
Hindenburg at Tannenberg, by Hugo Vogel

Colonel General Maximilian von Prittwitz, Commander, replaced on August 23
Colonel General Paul von Hindenburg, Commander

Maj. Gen. Erich Ludendorff, Chief of Staff
Maj. Gen. Paul Grünert, Quartermaster General
Maj. Gen. Otto Kersten, Chief Engineer
Lt. Col. Max Hoffmann, Chief of Operations

I Army Corps – General Hermann von François
Col. Walter Schmidt von Schmidtseck, Chief of Staff

1st Infantry Division – Lt. Gen. Richard von Conta

1st Infantry Brigade – Maj. Gen. Friedrich von Trotha

1st Grenadiers – Lt. Col. Eggerss
41st Infantry – Colonel Schönfeld

2nd Infantry Brigade – Maj. Gen. Conrado Paschen

3rd Grenadiers – Colonel von Wedel
43rd Infantry – Colonel von Eisenhart-Rothe

1st Field Artillery Brigade – Maj. Gen. Kurt Moewes

16th Field Artillery – Colonel Bromeis
52nd Field Artillery – Colonel Hellwig

8th Uhlans – Lt. Col. Freiherr Schäffer von Bernstein

2nd Infantry Division – Lt. Gen. Adalbert von Falk

3rd Infantry Brigade – Maj. Gen. Theodor Mengelbier

4th Grenadiers – Colonel Stern
44th Infantry – Colonel von Löper

4th Infantry Brigade – Maj. Gen. Bernhard Böß

33rd Fusiliers – Lt. Col. Weicke
45th Infantry – Colonel Maaß

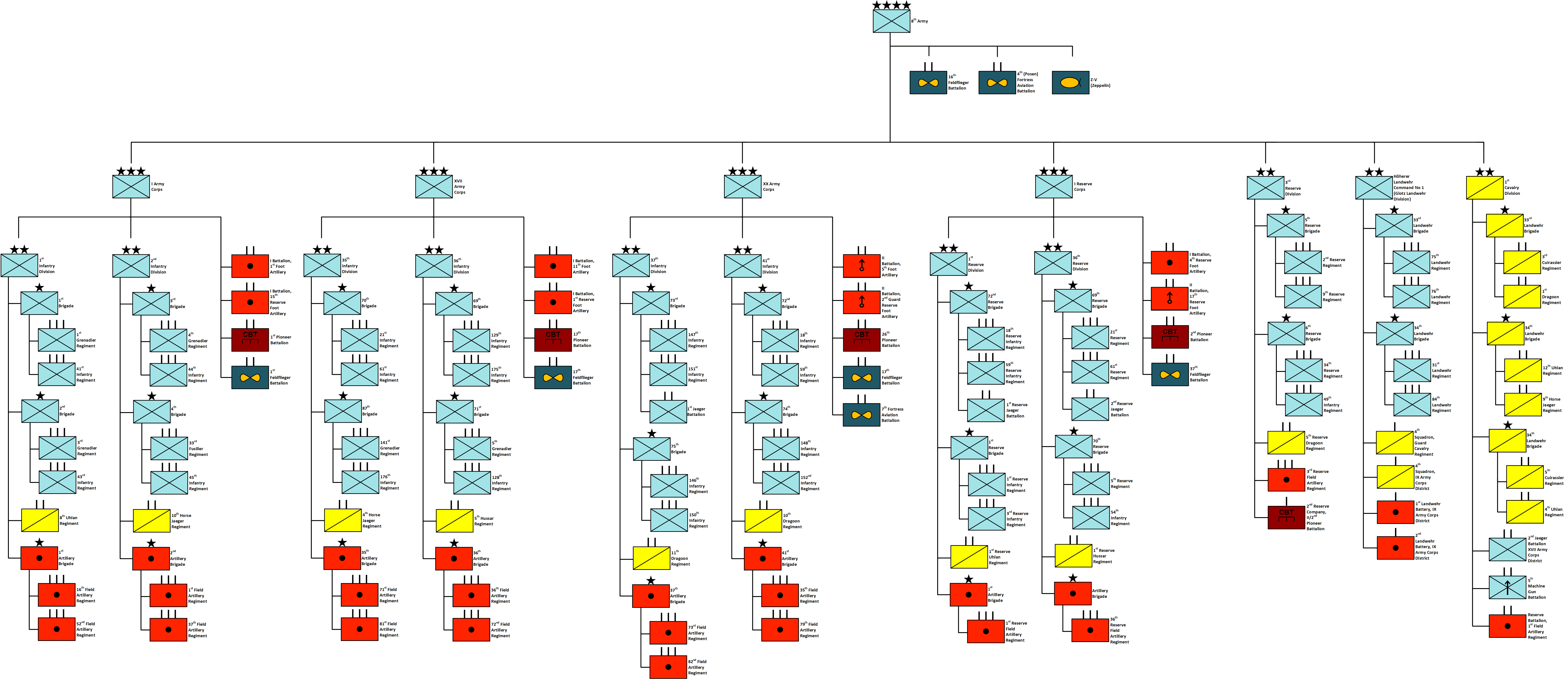
German 8th Army at the Battle of Tannenberg 26–31 August 1914

XVII Army Corps – General August von Mackensen

35th Infantry Division – Lt. Gen. Otto Hennig

70th Infantry Brigade – Maj. Gen. Heinrich Schmidt von Knobelsdorff

21st Infantry – Colonel Brunnemann
61st Infantry – Maj. Lüdecke

87th Infantry Brigade – Maj. Gen. Johannes von Hahn

141st Infantry – Lt. Col. von Steinkeller
176th Infantry – Maj. Runge

35th Field Artillery Brigade – Maj. Gen. Leopold Uhden

71st Field Artillery – Lt. Col. Hecht
81st Field Artillery – Lt. Col. Bertog

4th Mounted Rifles – Lt. Col. Freiherr von Lön

36th Infantry Division – Lt. Gen. Konstanz von Heineccius

69th Infantry Brigade – Maj. Gen. George von Engelbrechten

129th Infantry – Colonel Breßler
175th Infantry – Lt. Col. Schleenstein

71st Infantry Brigade – Colonel Lutz von Dewitz

5th Grenadiers – Colonel Freiherr von Eichendorff
128th Infantry – Colonel von Tresckow

36th Field Artillery Brigade – Maj. Gen. Viktor Hahndorff

36th Field Artillery – Maj. Waldeyer
72nd Field Artillery – Colonel von Rabenau

5th Hussars – Colonel Freiherr von Barnekow

XX Army Corps – General Friedrich von Scholtz

37th Infantry Division – Lt. Gen. Hermann von Staabs

73rd Infantry Brigade – Maj. Gen. Carl Wilhelmi

147th Infantry – Colonel Ritzsch
151st Infantry – Colonel Dorsch
1st Jager Battalion – Maj. Weigelt

75th Infantry Brigade – Maj. Gen. Alfred von Böckmann

146th Infantry – Colonel von Heydebreck
150th Infantry – Colonel Küster

37th Field Artillery Brigade – Maj. Gen. Wilhelm Buchholz

73rd Field Artillery – Colonel Forst
82nd Field Artillery – Lt. Col. Plantier

11th Dragoons – Lt. Col. Maaß

41st Infantry Division – Maj. Gen. Leo Sontag

72nd Infantry Brigade – Maj. Gen. Georg Schaer

18th Infantry – Colonel Mecke
59th Infantry – Colonel Sonntag

74th Infantry Brigade – Maj. Gen. Rudolf Reiser

148th Infantry – Colonel von der Osten
152nd Infantry – Colonel Geisler

41st Field Artillery Brigade – Maj. Gen. Wilhelm Johann Neugebauer

35th Field Artillery – Lt. Col. Wilke
79th Field Artillery – Lt. Col. Marcus

10th Dragoons – Lt. Col. von Lewinski

I Reserve Corps – Lt. Gen. Otto von Below

1st Reserve Division – Lt. Gen. Sigismund von Förster

1st Reserve Infantry Brigade – Ma. Gen. Karl Barre

1st Reserve Infantry – Lt. Col. von Sommerfeld und Falkenhayn
3rd Reserve Infantry – Lt. Col. von Steuber

72nd Reserve Infantry Brigade – Maj. Gen. Maximilian Gustav Licht

18th Reserve Infantry – Lt. Col. Freiherr von Lützow
59th Reserve Infantry – Lt. Col. Modrow
1st Reserve Jager Battalion – Cpt. Mellin

1st Reserve Field Artillery – Lt. Col. Schulz

3rd Reserve Division – Lt. Gen. Curt von Morgen

5th Reserve Infantry Brigade – Maj. Gen. Emil Hesse

2nd Reserve Infantry – Lt. Col. Rodig
9th Reserve Infantry – Lt. Col. Wobring

6th Reserve Infantry Brigade – Maj. Gen. Erich Krause

34th Reserve Infantry – Colonel Hein
49th Reserve Infantry – Lt. Col. Freiherr von Eberstein

3rd Reserve Field Artillery Maj. Erhardt

5th Reserve Dragoons – Maj. von Götz

1st Reserve Uhlans – Maj. Berner

36th Reserve Division – Maj. Gen. Kurt Kruge

69th Reserve Infantry Brigade – Maj. Gen. Otto von Homeyer

21st Reserve Infantry – Lt. Col. Heyn
61st Reserve Infantry – Colonel Immanuel
2nd Reserve Jager Battalion – Cpt. Brückner

70th Reserve Infantry Brigade – Maj. Gen. Detlev Vett

5th Reserve Infantry – Lt. Col. Graf zu Reventlow
54th Infantry (detached from the 3rd Division at the outbreak of war) – Colonel von Tippelskirch

36th Reserve Field Artillery – Lt. Col. Lannert

1st Reserve Hussars – Maj. von Borcke

Höheres Landwehr Kommando No. 1 / 1st Landwehr Division – Lt. Gen. Georg Freiherr von der Goltz

33rd Mixed Landwehr Brigade – Maj. Gen. Viktor von Oertzen

75th Landwehr Infantry – Lt. Col. von Stwolinski
76th Landwehr Infantry – Lt. Col. Billig

34th Mixed Landwehr Brigade – Lt. Gen. Ernst von Pressentin

31st Landwehr Infantry – Lt. Col. von Lilienhoff-Zwowitzki
84th Landwehr Infantry – Colonel Becker

Landwehr Cavalry Regiment – Cpt. von Sydow

1st Cavalry Division – Lt. Gen. Hermann Brecht

1st Cavalry Brigade – Colonel Wedig von Glasenapp

3rd (East Prussian) Cuirassiers "Count Wrangel" – Lt. Col. von Lewinski
1st (Lithuanian) Dragoons "Prince Albrecht of Prussia" – Lt. Col. Graf von Kanitz

2nd Cavalry Brigade – Maj. Gen. Robert Freiherr von Kapherr

12th (Lithuanian) Uhlans – Colonel von Below
9th Jäger zu Pferde – Lt. Col. von Koppelow

41st Cavalry Brigade – Maj. Gen. Heinrich von Hofmann

5th (West Prussian) Cuirassiers "Duke Frederick Eugene of Württemberg" – Lt. Col. von Rex
4th (1st Pomeranian) Uhlans "von Schmidt" – Maj. Charisius

Other units in the field

Königsbergs Reserve – Lt. Gen. Günther von Pappritz
Königsberg Fortress Division – Lt. Gen. Georg Ludwig Franz Brodrück
Thorn Fortress Division (35th Reserve Division) – Lt. Gen. Max Philipp von Schmettau
Graudenz Fortress Division – Maj. Gen. Fritz von Unger
Lötzen Fortress Brigade – Colonel Busse
6th Landwehr Brigade – Maj. Gen. Adolf Karl Krahmer
70th Landwehr Brigade – Maj. Gen. Adolf Breithaupt

Reinforcements

Posen Fortress Division
1st Landwehr Division
2nd Landwehr Brigade – Colonel Arthur Freiherr von Lupin

From the Western Front

XI Army Corps

22nd Division
38th Division

Guards Reserve Corps

3rd Guards Infantry Division
1st Guards Reserve Division
