= XVII Corps (German Empire) =

Military unit of the German Army from 1890–1919

XVII Army Corps XVII. Armee-Korps
- Flag of the Staff of a Generalkommando (1871–1918)
- Active: 1 April 1890–1919
- Country: German Empire
- Type: Corps
- Size: Approximately 44,000 (on mobilisation in 1914)
- Garrison/HQ: Danzig\Elisabethwall 2
- Shoulder strap piping: Yellow
- Engagements: World War I Battle of Gumbinnen Battle of Tannenberg (1914) First Battle of the Masurian Lakes Battle of the Vistula River German summer offensive 1915 Bug–Narew Offensive Second battle of Przasnysz Narew Offensive

Insignia
- Abbreviation: XVII AK

The XVII Army Corps / XVII AK (German: XVII. Armee-Korps) was a corps level command of the German Army before and during World War I.

As the German Army expanded in the latter part of the 19th century, the XVII Army Corps was set up on 1 April 1890 in Danzig as the Generalkommando (headquarters) for West Prussia. It took command of two divisions formed on the same date: 35th Division and 36th Division. It was assigned to the I Army Inspectorate, which became the 8th Army at the start of the First World War.

XVII Corps served on the Eastern Front from the start of the war. It was still in existence at the end of the war in the 7th Army, Heeresgruppe Deutscher Kronprinz on the Western Front. In 1919, the corps served with the Grenzschutz Ost (border protection east) in Danzig, West Prussia.

== Formation ==
By a law of 27 January 1890, it was decided to separate the Province of West Prussia from the Province of East Prussia in military affairs. It stipulated that, from 1 April 1890, the entire power of the Army of the German Empire should be 20 army corps (Guards, I - XVII, I and II Bavarian).

The All-highest Cabinet Order (Allerhöchste Kabinettsorder, AKO) of 1 February 1890 authorised the formation of the XVI and XVII Army Corps. The latter was assigned to the I Army Inspectorate and included the territory of the Landwehr districts Schlawe, Stolp, Konitz, Thorn, Graudenz, Danzig, Preußisch Stargard, Neustadt, Osterode, Deutsch-Eylau and Marienburg.

Later, the districts of Osterode, Deutsch-Eylau and Marienburg would be reassigned to the XX Corps.

== Peacetime organisation ==
The 25 peacetime Corps of the German Army (Guards, I - XXI, I - III Bavarian) had a reasonably standardised organisation. Each consisted of two divisions with usually two infantry brigades, one field artillery brigade and a cavalry brigade each. Each brigade normally consisted of two regiments of the appropriate type, so each Corps normally commanded 8 infantry, 4 field artillery and 4 cavalry regiments. There were exceptions to this rule:

V, VI, VII, IX and XIV Corps each had a 5th infantry brigade (so 10 infantry regiments)
II, XIII, XVIII and XXI Corps had a 9th infantry regiment
I, VI and XVI Corps had a 3rd cavalry brigade (so 6 cavalry regiments)
the Guards Corps had 11 infantry regiments (in 5 brigades) and 8 cavalry regiments (in 4 brigades).

Each Corps also directly controlled a number of other units. This could include one or more

Foot Artillery Regiment
Jäger Battalion
Pioneer Battalion
Train Battalion

Peacetime organization of the Corps
Corps	Division	Brigade	Units	Garrison
XVII Corps	35th Division	70th Infantry Brigade	21st (4th Pomeranian) Infantry "von Borcke"	Thorn
XVII Corps	35th Division	70th Infantry Brigade	61st (8th Pomeranian) Infantry "von der Marwitz"	Thorn
XVII Corps	35th Division	87th Infantry Brigade	141st (Kulm) Infantry	Graudenz, III Bn in Strasburg in Westpreußen
XVII Corps	35th Division	87th Infantry Brigade	176th (9th West Prussian) Infantry	Kulm, II Bn in Thorn
XVII Corps	35th Division	35th Field Artillery Brigade	71st Field Artillery "Grand Komtur"	Graudenz
XVII Corps	35th Division	35th Field Artillery Brigade	81st (Thorn) Field Artillery	Thorn
XVII Corps	35th Division	35th Cavalry Brigade	5th (Pomeranian) Hussars "Prince Blücher of Wahlstatt"	Stolp
XVII Corps	35th Division	35th Cavalry Brigade	4th Jäger zu Pferde	Graudenz
XVII Corps	36th Division	69th Infantry Brigade	129th (3rd West Prussian) Infantry	Graudenz
XVII Corps	36th Division	69th Infantry Brigade	175th (8th West Prussian) Infantry	Graudenz, II Bn in Schwetz
XVII Corps	36th Division	71st Infantry Brigade	5th (4th East Prussian) Grenadiers "King Frederick I"	Danzig
XVII Corps	36th Division	71st Infantry Brigade	128th (Danzig) Infantry	Danzig, II Bn in Neufahrwasser
XVII Corps	36th Division	36th Field Artillery Brigade	36th (2nd West Prussian) Field Artillery	Danzig
XVII Corps	36th Division	36th Field Artillery Brigade	72nd Field Artillery "Grand Master"	Marienwerder, Preußisch Stargard
XVII Corps	36th Division	Leib Hussar Brigade	1st Life Hussars "Totenkopf"	Danzig-Langfuhr
XVII Corps	36th Division	Leib Hussar Brigade	2nd Life Hussars "Queen Victoria of Prussia"	Danzig-Langfuhr
XVII Corps	Corps Troops		2nd (Pomeranian) Jäger Battalion "Fürst Bismarck"	Kulm
XVII Corps	Corps Troops		4th Machine Gun Abteilung	Thorn
XVII Corps	Corps Troops		3rd Fortress Machine Gun Abteilung	Graudenz
XVII Corps	Corps Troops		4th Fortress Machine Gun Abteilung	Graudenz
XVII Corps	Corps Troops		5th Fortress Machine Gun Abteilung	Thorn
XVII Corps	Corps Troops		11th (1st West Prussian) Foot Artillery	Thorn
XVII Corps	Corps Troops		17th (2nd West Prussian) Foot Artillery	Danzig, Pillau
XVII Corps	Corps Troops		17th (1st West Prussian) Pioneer Battalion	Thorn
XVII Corps	Corps Troops		5th Telegraph Battalion	Danzig, Berlin, Schneidemühl
XVII Corps	Corps Troops		1st (Fortress-)Telephone Company	Thorn
XVII Corps	Corps Troops		2nd (Fortress-)Telephone Company	Graudenz
XVII Corps	Corps Troops		17th (West Prussian) Train Battalion	Danzig
XVII Corps	Graudenz Defence Command (Landwehr-Inspektion)			Graudenz

== World War I ==
=== Organisation on mobilisation ===
On mobilization on 2 August 1914, the Corps was restructured. The Leib Hussar Brigade was withdrawn to form part of the 2nd Cavalry Division and the 35th Cavalry Brigade was broken up and its regiments assigned to the divisions as reconnaissance units. Divisions received engineer companies and other support units from the Corps headquarters. In summary, XVII Corps mobilised with 25 infantry battalions, 9 machine gun companies (54 machine guns), 8 cavalry squadrons, 24 field artillery batteries (144 guns), 4 heavy artillery batteries (16 guns), 3 pioneer companies and an aviation detachment.

Initial wartime organization of the Corps
Corps	Division	Brigade	Units
XVII Corps	35th Division	70th Infantry Brigade	21st Infantry Regiment
XVII Corps	35th Division	70th Infantry Brigade	61st Infantry Regiment
XVII Corps	35th Division	87th Infantry Brigade	141st Infantry Regiment
XVII Corps	35th Division	87th Infantry Brigade	176th Infantry Regiment
XVII Corps	35th Division	87th Infantry Brigade	2nd Jäger Battalion
XVII Corps	35th Division	35th Field Artillery Brigade	71st Field Artillery Regiment
XVII Corps	35th Division	35th Field Artillery Brigade	81st Field Artillery Regiment
XVII Corps	35th Division		4th Jäger zu Pferde Regiment
XVII Corps	35th Division		1st Company, 17th Pioneer Battalion
XVII Corps	35th Division		35th Divisional Pontoon Train
XVII Corps	35th Division		2nd Medical Company
XVII Corps	36th Division	69th Infantry Brigade	129th Infantry Regiment
XVII Corps	36th Division	69th Infantry Brigade	175th Infantry Regiment
XVII Corps	36th Division	71st Infantry Brigade	5th Grenadier Regiment
XVII Corps	36th Division	71st Infantry Brigade	128th Infantry Regiment
XVII Corps	36th Division	36th Field Artillery Brigade	36th Field Artillery Regiment
XVII Corps	36th Division	36th Field Artillery Brigade	72nd Field Artillery Regiment
XVII Corps	36th Division		5th Hussar Regiment
XVII Corps	36th Division		2nd Company, 17th Pioneer Battalion
XVII Corps	36th Division		3rd Company, 17th Pioneer Battalion
XVII Corps	36th Division		36th Divisional Pontoon Train
XVII Corps	36th Division		1st Medical Company
XVII Corps	36th Division		3rd Medical Company
XVII Corps	Corps Troops		I Battalion, 11th Foot Artillery Regiment
XVII Corps	Corps Troops		17th Aviation Detachment
XVII Corps	Corps Troops		17th Corps Pontoon Train
XVII Corps	Corps Troops		17th Telephone Detachment
XVII Corps	Corps Troops		17th Pioneer Searchlight Section
XVII Corps	Corps Troops		Munition Trains and Columns corresponding to II Corps

=== Combat chronicle ===
On mobilisation, XVII Corps was assigned to the 8th Army to defend East Prussia, while the rest of the Army executed the Schlieffen Plan offensive in August 1914. It took part in the battles of Gumbinnen, Tannenberg and 1st Masurian Lakes. Immediately after the latter, it joined the 9th Army in Lower Silesia, where it fought at the Battle of the Vistula River.

== Commanders ==
The XVII Corps had the following commanders during its existence:

Dates	Rank	Name
24 March 1890	General der Infanterie	August von Lentze
3 April 1902	General der Infanterie	Georg von Braunschweig
27 January 1908	General der Kavallerie	August von Mackensen
2 November 1914	General der Infanterie	Günther von Pannewitz
7 September 1916	Generalleutnant	Paul Fleck
19 February 1918	Generalleutnant	Richard von Webern
23 June 1918	Generalleutnant	Günther von Etzel
27 August 1918	Generalleutnant	Axel von Petersdorff
13 December 1918	General der Infanterie	Otto von Below
27 June 1919		Johannes von Malachowski

== See also ==
- German Army order of battle (1914)
- German Army order of battle, Western Front (1918)
- List of Imperial German infantry regiments
- List of Imperial German artillery regiments
- List of Imperial German cavalry regiments
- Order of battle at Tannenberg

== Bibliography ==
- Cron, Hermann (2002). Imperial German Army 1914–18: Organisation, Structure, Orders-of-Battle [first published: 1937]. Helion & Co. ISBN 1-874622-70-1.
- Ellis, John; Cox, Michael (1993). The World War I Databook. Aurum Press Ltd. ISBN 1-85410-766-6.
- Haythornthwaite, Philip J. (1996). The World War One Source Book. Arms and Armour. ISBN 1-85409-351-7.
- Histories of Two Hundred and Fifty-One Divisions of the German Army which Participated in the War (1914–1918), compiled from records of Intelligence section of the General Staff, American Expeditionary Forces, at General Headquarters, Chaumont, France 1919. The London Stamp Exchange. 1989 [1920]. ISBN 0-948130-87-3.
- The German Forces in the Field; 7th Revision, 11th November 1918; Compiled by the General Staff, War Office. Imperial War Museum, London and the Battery Press. 1995 [1918]. ISBN 978-1-870423-95-3.
