= Narew Offensive =

1915 German offensive on the Eastern Front of World War I

- Part of the Bug-Narew Offensive of Eastern Front of World War I
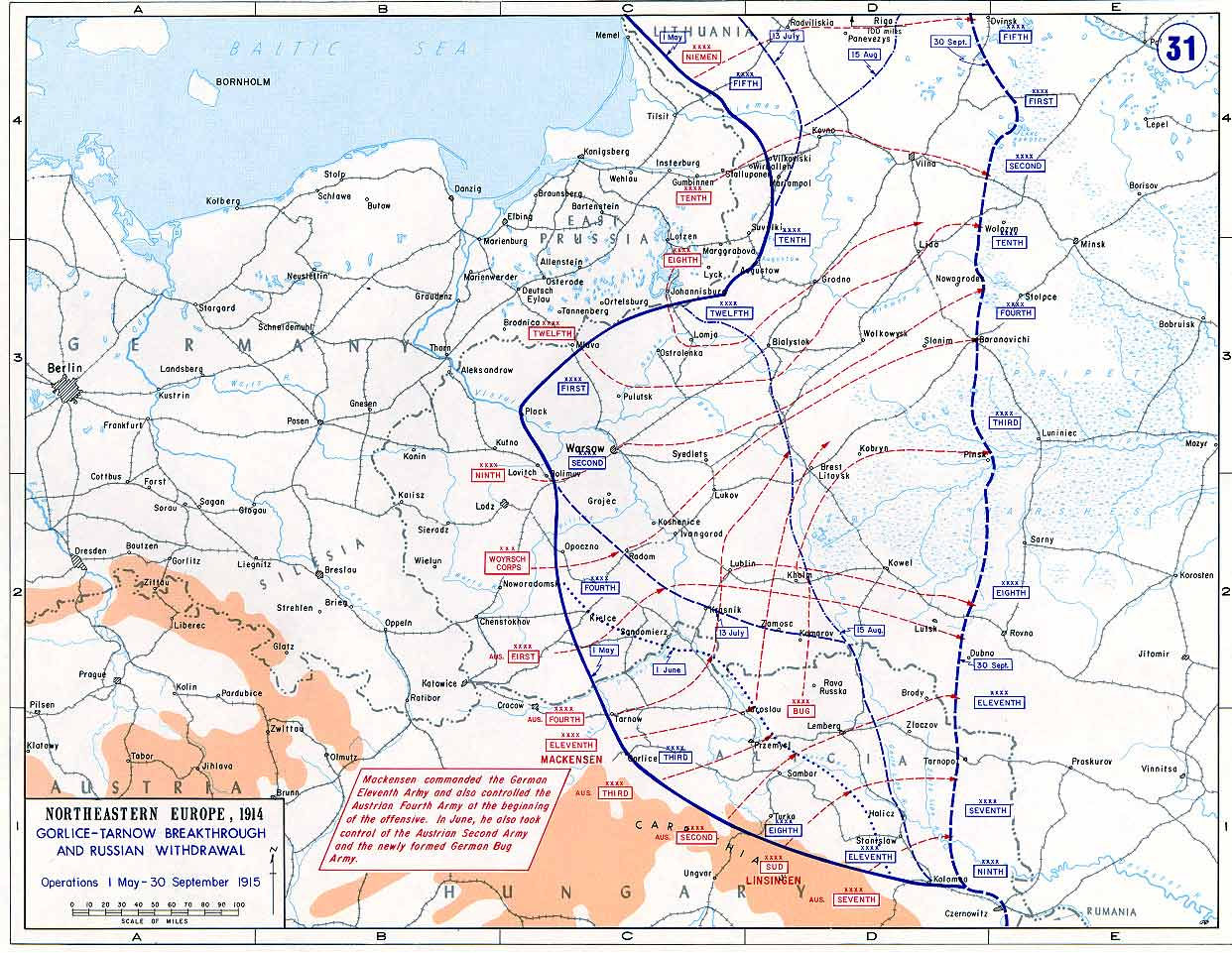
- Bug-Narew Offensive; and Russian withdrawal
Date	19 July – 3 August 1915
Location	Narew area (present-day Poland)
Result	German victory: Part of the Bug-Narew Offensive.

Belligerents
German Empire	Russian Empire

Commanders and leaders
(German Empire) Paul von Hindenburg; (German Empire) Erich Ludendorff; (German Empire) Max Hoffmann; (German Empire) Max von Gallwitz	Mikhail Alekseyev; Alexander Litvinov

Units involved
(German Empire) 12th Army; (German Empire) 8th Army	1st Army; 12th Army

Strength
335,696 men	583,756 men

Casualties and losses
60,482 men	133,069 men; including 45,000 prisoners

The World War I German Narew offensive followed after the minor success in the Second battle of Przasnysz. In stubborn battles, the Imperial German army forced the numerically superior forces of the Russian Army to retreat, but could not inflict a decisive defeat on them.

== Battle ==
The goal of the next stage of the German offensive after the victory in the Second battle of Przasnysz was to capture the course of the Narew River from Różan to Pultusk; at the same time, a corps was allocated to each of the fortresses, and the XVII Corps had to cross the river between these points. Strongly fortified positions at Różan and Pultusk, the presence of separate forts built before the war, included in a single defensive system, could not be broken through on the move. Max von Gallwitz considered it necessary to reinforce the XIII Corps against Różan with at least one 30.5-cm gun, and sent two 42-cm mortars against Pultusk to the XIII Corps.

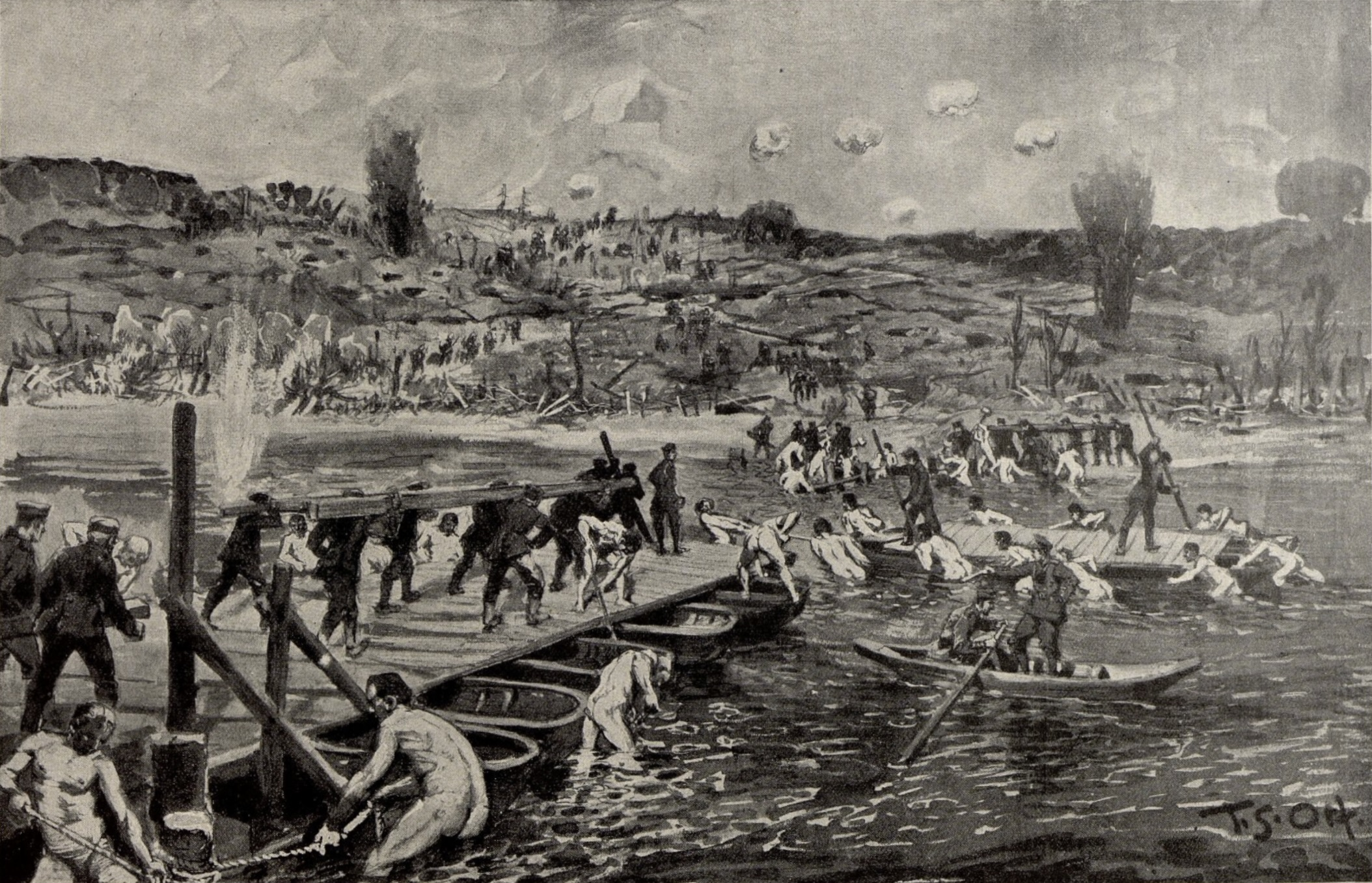
German pioneers build bridges over the Narew river (German illustration)

On July 19, the Germans were preparing for the offensive. At the same time, it turned out that due to the delay of heavy artillery, not all corps were ready to launch an attack at the same time. Paul von Hindenburg and Erich Ludendorff called for hastening preparations: at the same time, a demand was put forward for a tighter blockade of the fortress of Novogeorgievsk (now Modlin Fortress). On the left flank, the German 8th Army reached the right bank of the Narew River at the mouth of the Rozoga River could act either by crossing the river or advancing on Ostrołęka. The withdrawal of the 1st Army beyond the Narew also led to the withdrawal of the 2nd Army closer to Warsaw. The 12th Siberian Rifle Division and 68th Infantry Divisions were sent to Ostrołęka and Białystok from the 5th Army, which also fought heavy battles, and the 58th Infantry Division from the 8th Army of the Southwestern Front was additionally assigned to the Novogeorgievsk garrison.

On the night of July 20, Alexander Litvinov, making sure that the Max von Gallwitz's army group was pursuing small forces, ordered from 10 o'clock in the morning to go on the offensive: the 1st Cavalry Corps on Dzbądz and Gnojno, going to the rear of the German group at the Różan's fortifications. 4th Army Corps on Maków, 21st Army Corps on Khrzanowo for joint operations with cavalry. The Germans by this time was already 400-800 steps from the Russian trenches. The beginning of the Russian offensive coincided with the attacks of the German XIII Corps on the Różan's fortifications, where the Germans managed to capture Hill 132. In the sectors of the 1st Cavalry, 4th and 21st Army Corps, a stubborn battle went on all day. In the morning, the Russian troops managed to successfully cross the Narew River and push back the German's barriers and vanguards, but from the middle of the day the Germans brought the main forces into battle and threw the Russians back behind the Narew. The Gnojno village changed hands four times and was abandoned. At 21.15, on the orders chief of the staff of the North-Western Front Mikhail Alekseyev, the offensive was stopped, the Russian corps returned to their original positions, retaining vanguards and patrols in the points still held behind Mariew (by order of Litvinov). At night, the Germans pushed back the 2nd brigade of the 33rd infantry division to Paulina. With great difficulty manage to stop the breakthrough with counterattacks. On the basis of the false testimony of the prisoner, Litvinov believed that the Germans had brought the entire XXV Reserve Corps into battle, and was preparing for new German attempts to cross the Narew River near Pultusk.

During July 21, an attack group was assembled in the Gallwitz's army group to attack Pultusk under the command of General of Infantry Otto von Plüskow. Transferring the 38th Infantry Division to the XVII Corps covering the operation, he received the 1st Guards and 50th Reserve and 85th Landwehr, 86th and 88th Infantry Divisions and the Pfeil brigade.

On the night of July 23, German artillery opened heavy fire on Russian positions. At dawn, the German infantry went on the offensive. Two groups of the XI Corps bypassed Pultusk, breaking through the positions of the 4th Army Corps in many places. The XVII Corps crossed the Narew River, the 1st Cavalry Corps could not hold back the onslaught of the Germans. At noon, Litvinov ordered the 1st Siberian Army Corps to deliver a “decisive and quick” blow to the enemy’s flank, and the 4th Army Corps and cavalry with the 1st Rifle Brigade to push back the Germans behind the Narew and restore the situation. But by 18 o'clock, the Russian troops were completely upset and broke through in many places, an 8-km gap formed between the 1st Turkestan and 4th Army Corps, and the commander of the 1st Army asked the front headquarters for permission to withdraw troops behind the fort belt of Novogeorgievsk.

By 19.30, the German breakthrough was closed by the introduction of the 11th Siberian Rifle Division into battle: Litvinov hoped to go on the counteroffensive after the arrival of the 27th Army Corps, but the situation turned out to be more difficult. The advantage of the Germans in artillery led to high losses. At 22:00 Litvinov ordered the 1st Army to retreat across the Narew River and destroy all bridges. The 1st Army occupied a new defensive line without interference by 7 o'clock on July 24. The Germans entered Różan and Pultusk. But even in the new position, Litvinov did not hope to hold on, "since there are not enough cartridges and the line itself is not fortified, but on the right flank it is inconvenient for defense." He asked M. Alekseyev to transfer the 78th Infantry Division to him to reinforce the 21st Army Corps.

On July 24, an army group of infantry general Hans Hartwig von Beseler was detached from M. von Gallwitz's army group to act against the fortress of Novogeorgievsk as part of the corps of Lieutenant General Gustaf von Dickhuth-Harrach, 89th Infantry, 14th and 85th Landwehr divisions, Colonel Pfeil's brigade, 169th Landwehr brigade and heavy artillery of all corps west of Pultusk. The new task of Gallwitz was access to the lower reaches of the Bug River. During the day, German troops approached the positions of the 1st Russian Army. If the 21st Army Corps was able to repel the attacks, then the 1st Cavalry Corps, followed by the 27th and 4th Army Corps, retreated. The 1st Siberian Army Corps was sent to counteract, but the German offensive continued successfully.

M. Alekseyev, taking into account the course of battles both in the 1st Army and in other sectors of the front, on July 24 sent a directive to the army on the general withdrawal of the 12th, 1st, 2nd and 4th Armies to the line Łomża - Węgrów - Siedlce and the continuation of deterrence actions of the 3rd and 13th armies at the positions of Łęczna - Chełm - Vladimir-Volynsky, with a possible withdrawal of troops to Kovel. At the same time, the 2nd Army was supposed to move to the right bank of the Vistula River, holding the line of the outer Warsaw forts, and the 1st and 4th armies - to support it from the flanks, showing "full energy, outstanding firmness and stubbornness." So the actions of the 1st Army were tied to the Warsaw bridgehead, despite the growing threat of a German breakthrough to the middle reaches of the Bug River.

A. Litvinov, ordered the troops to go on the offensive in the morning of July 26 and drive the Germans across the Narew River. Litvinov also asked A. Churin to help him with the active actions of the 12th Army and appealed to the corps commanders: “There is no doubt that the first resistance that the enemy will put up against our offensive will be very stubborn, the more skillful, swifter, more decisive and persistent the offensive should be”.

On the morning of July 26, the corps of the 1st Army, which went on the offensive along the entire front, met stubborn resistance from the Germans. Attacks were met and fought off with dense artillery, machine-gun and small arms fire, settlements changed hands several times. Litvinov hoped to continue the offensive on July 27 and gave the corresponding order at 20.40: "The resistance of the Germans has not yet been broken, but can be broken by our stubborn and persistent efforts."

However, on the night of July 27, German troops again broke through the positions of the 4th Siberian Army Corps and captured the right flank of the 1st Army. Litvinov ordered the 21st Army Corps to be withdrawn, and the gap to Żabin to be occupied by the 6th Cavalry Division, urgently called at 1.30 from the 1st Cavalry Corps. By morning, the front was also reinforced by three regiments of the 78th Infantry Division; there was no strength left to develop the offensive.

Until the evening of July 27, the left flank of the 1st Army unsuccessfully attacked the German positions from the outer forts of Novogeorgievsk to Adamowo and Dąbrówka. At midnight, A. Litvinov again ordered to continue the offensive. In the 12th Army, the left flank continued to retreat under pressure German 1st Corps. The 4th Siberian Corps was reinforced by the regiments of the 68th Infantry Division, but the Germans broke through the positions of the 5th Army Corps with the forces of the 37th Infantry Division. The commander of the 12th Army, A. Churin, asked the front headquarters to support him with reserves, since a breakthrough to Nowogródek was becoming more and more dangerous. Gallwitz also sent the 54th Infantry Division, which had arrived from France, to Ostrołęka. But he considered it risky to transport the division across the Narew on improvised means, especially since the I Corps had already lost more than 3,000 men, and after the Russian artillery destroyed the pontoons, the supply of ammunition almost stopped.

On July 28–29, the Russian 1st and 12th Armies tried to push back the German regiments that had crossed over the Narew River, but everywhere they met stubborn opposition. Mutual attacks led to the depletion of the forces of the parties and a small advance (in the 4th Army Corps - by 400 steps). Considering that the Russians had exhausted their forces in fruitless attacks, E. Ludendorff, set Gallwitz the following task: to take the right and advance on Ostrow and Małkin, but at the same time not to storm the fortresses, covering the actions with the troops of the 8th Army. On July 30, Gallwitz instructed the group of infantry general Johannes von Eben (2nd, 37th, 54th and 83rd infantry divisions) to defeat the 4th Siberian Corps and occupy Żabin, the XIII Corps to attack Strumiany, and the rest of the troops of the army group - go on the defensive.

On the evening of July 28, Alekseyev, transferred the 21st Army Corps (33rd, 44th, 78th Infantry Divisions) to the 12th Army along with its combat sector, to the same regiments of the 59th Infantry Division were sent: in the 1st Army, from the evening of July 30, the 4th Army Corps (30th and 40th Infantry Divisions) was withdrawn to the reserve. In the 12th Army, Chief of Staff N. Sivers ordered the creation of small reserve detachments in each corps to repel German breakthroughs.

On July 30, there were no more serious battles on the front of the 1st Army. All the efforts of the army group of Gallwitz were directed against the Russian 12th Army. The 4th Guards and 54th Infantry Divisions broke through the location of the 4th Siberian Army Corps in the afternoon and occupied Goworówek and Żabin by evening. Churin sent the 68th Infantry and 6th Cavalry Divisions (from the 1st Army) to the breakthrough site, but they only temporarily managed to stop the advance of the Germans.

On July 31, Gallwitz, having learned that on the bridgehead beyond the Narew River near Kamionka for the fifth day blocked six battalions of the 37th Infantry Division, sent heavy artillery to it and resumed attacks by the forces of the I and XIII Corps. The offensive was met with attacks from the Russian 59th Infantry Division, and the fighting for Hill 111 continued until evening. The troops of the 4th Siberian and 21st Army Corps were driven back but escaped envelopment. New positions were occupied from Brzeźno to Ostrołęka. Only the German 83rd Infantry Division lost 84 officers and 3,100 soldiers in battle. The losses of the Russian side were also great. Since the beginning of the operation, 161 officers and 44,926 soldiers have been captured, 14 guns, 133 machine guns, and 6 mortars have been lost.

Gallwitz pulled the 50th reserve division to the right flank, transferring the 85th landwehr division to the Beseler's army group to blockade the Novogeorgievsk fortress from the northeast, and sent the I and XIII Corps to the east of border Rozan, Ostrołęka. In the battles of August 1–2, German troops managed to capture the village Grabowo and the heights near the village of Borawe with heavy losses, constantly repelling counterattacks of the 4th Siberian, 5th and 21st Army Corps. The German 8th Army pushed back the 1st Army Corps of the 12th Army at Kupnino and Serwatki. By August 3, due to heavy losses, the 1st Army Corps and the 4th Siberian Corps were withdrawn to the replenishment of manpower and reorganization.
