= Second battle of Przasnysz =

1915 German offensive on the Eastern Front of World War I

- Part of the Eastern Front of World War I
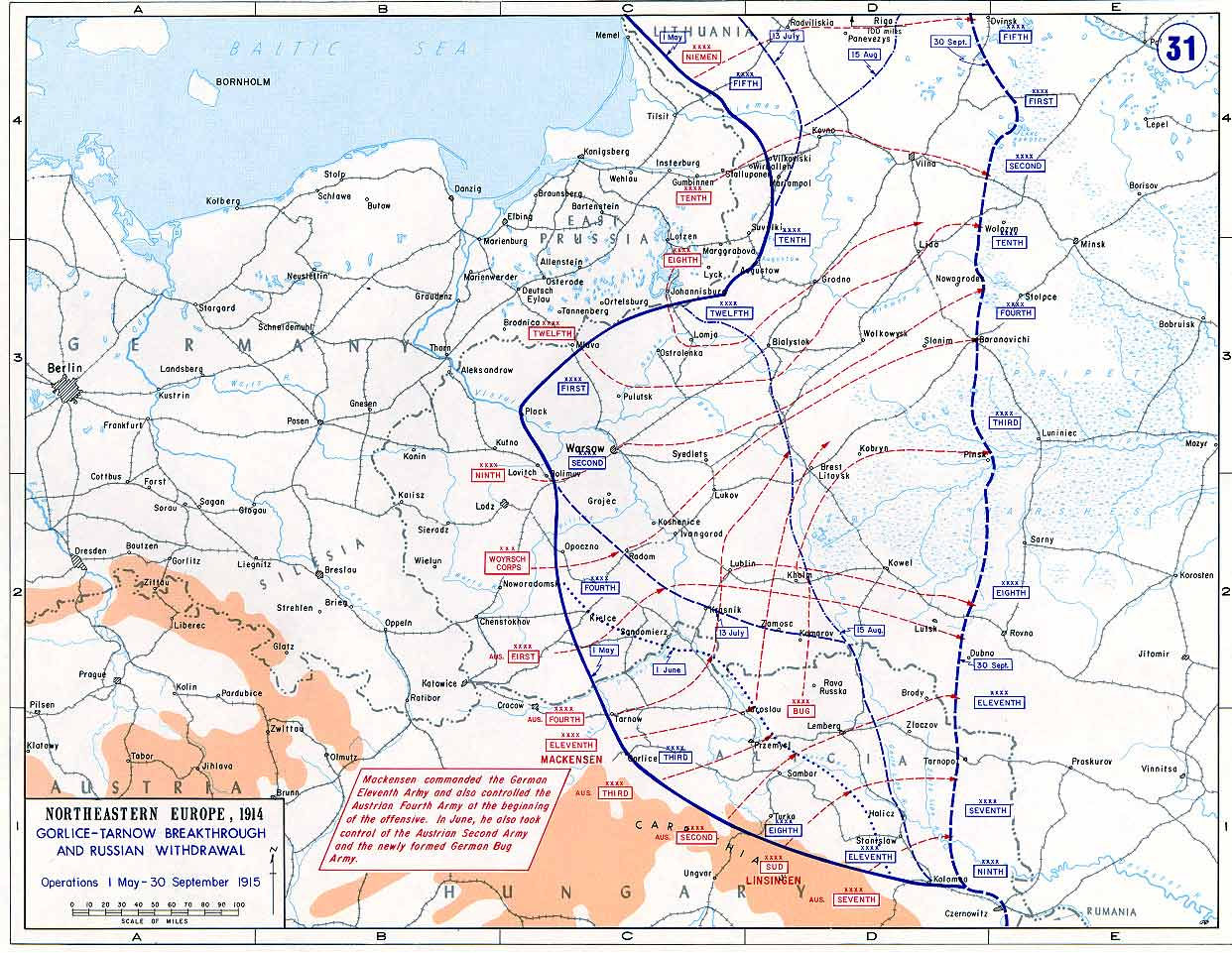
- Bug-Narew Offensive and Russian withdrawal
Date	13–18 July 1915
Location	Bug and Narew area, (present-day Poland)
Result	Indecisive (Note: The tactical success of the Germans and the strategic success of the Russians, the plans of the Germans were eventually changed and they abandoned the original goal - a breakthrough to the southern part of the kingdom of Poland)

Belligerents
German Empire	Russian Empire

Units involved
(German Empire) Armee-Gruppe Gallwitz	1st Army

Strength
281,784 men	378,095 men

Casualties and losses
20,000	40,000 men 12 guns and 48 machine guns

The second battle of Przasnysz took place at the beginning of a major Bug-Narew Offensive of the Imperial German army on the German Eastern front. In the course of a stubborn battle, German troops under the command of Max von Gallwitz broke into the heavily fortified defenses of the outnumbered Russian army and took the city of Przasnysz.

== Battle ==
On the night of July 13, the German troops of the Gallwitz's army group approached the Russian positions at a distance of 1 km. The Supreme Commander of All German Forces in the East, Field Marshal Paul von Hindenburg, arrived in Willenberg, at the headquarters of the Gallwitz's army group. Against the section from Grudusk to Stegna, the German army concentrated the XIII, XVII and XI Corps; each of the divisions had two regiments in first line and a regiment in reserve. Against them were the positions of the Russian 1st, 2nd and 11th Siberian Rifle Divisions. Having no advantage in forces along the entire front, Gallwitz created a double superiority in numbers in the shock sector. Early in the morning (at 4.45) artillery preparation was started, but due to heavy rain the attack was delayed until 9-10 o'clock, artillery fire was moved deep into the Russian positions, the attacking infantry was accompanied by groups of sappers. The commander of the Russian 1st Army, Cavalry General Alexander Litvinov, sent the 3rd Turkestan Rifle Brigade and the 14th Cavalry Division to the site of fierce fighting. The Chief of the staff of North-Western Front, Mikhail Alekseyev, ordered the transfer his reserve to the 1st Army: the 21st Army Corps and the 4th Army Corps from the 2nd Army.

By noon, German troops occupied Grudusk and captured the entire first Russian line, heavily destroyed by German artillery, and most of the second line. The greatest success was achieved by the German XIII Corps, which forced the 2nd Siberian Rifle Division, despite the support of the 1st Brigade of the 1st Siberian Rifle Division, to retreat by night to a rear position from Krasnosielc to the village of Szczuki. The Germans advanced deep into the Russian positions to a depth of 3 to 10 km. During the day, 5,400 prisoners, 5 guns and 20 machine guns were captured. On the site of the 1st Turkestan Corps, the 1st and 2nd Turkestan rifle brigades were introduced into battle.

At 10 o'clock on July 14, the German 36th Infantry Division passed Przasnysz; aerial reconnaissance reported the beginning of a mass withdrawal of Russian rears and convoys. By noon, the pursuing units of the XI Corps broke through the intermediate Russian positions, on the right flank of the Gallwitz army group, the Russians also began to withdraw.

By evening, the 4th Russian defensive line was broken through. The XVII Reserve Corps, which joined the offensive, went to Ciechanów and began to approach Novogeorgievsk. However, in general, rainy weather did not allow the German army to organize a quick pursuit and bring up heavy artillery in a timely manner. The commander of the North-Western Front, M. Alekseyev, arrived at Litvinov’s headquarters; the 30th and 40th Infantry Divisions and the 3rd Turkestan Rifle Brigade began to arrive and pour into combat areas.

On July 15, the German troops continued the onslaught on parts of the Russian 1st Army, but were not able to move forward in all sectors. The XIII Corps unsuccessfully attacked the well-fortified positions of the 1st Siberian Army Corps, reinforced by the 30th Infantry Division. Only some success of the neighboring 1st Army Corps forced M. Alekseyev, in order to avoid envelopment, to allow the withdrawal of the 4th Siberian Army Corps and the right flank of the 2nd Siberian Rifle Division.

The German XVII Corps conducted stubborn attacks all day long at the junction of the 30th Infantry and 11th Siberian Rifle Divisions, captured Hill 124 near Dziki Bór. After the breakthrough of the units of the 1st Guards Reserve Division, the Russian 14th Cavalry Division was thrown into battle both on horseback and on foot: its counterattack was repulsed, but the advance of the Germans was stopped. The XI Corps, having introduced a fresh 50th reserve division into battle, was able to push back two Russian Turkestan rifle brigades and the German reserve division T. von Wernitz captured the redoubts at Długołęka. The resumption of the offensive from 19:00 and the introduction of the 14th Landwehr Division into battle led to the coverage of the Russian 1st Turkestan Army Corps and its retreat. However, it was not possible to break a gap in the orders of the Russian 1st Army, since the gaps were filled in time with the reinforcements brought in.

By the night of July 16, at the headquarters of the army group of M. von Gallwitz, the development of an operation against the Russian fortress of Novogeorgievsk and to force the Narew River began. However, the slowdown of the offensive on the left flank caused the intervention of the chief of staff of the Supreme Commander of All German Forces in the East, Lieutenant-General E. Ludendorff: instead of a barrier at Ostrołęka, he demanded to attack the fortress. Gallwitz believed that this direction should be transferred to the 8th Army, and directed the offensive of the corps to Pultusk and Różan.

A. Litvinov, having received the necessary reinforcements, ordered from the night of July 16 the 1st Siberian and 1st Turkestan Army Corps to go on the offensive and restore the previous situation. But this order remained unfulfilled: already at 4 o'clock the Germans resumed artillery preparation, which soon reached hurricane strength. At 6 o'clock, the division of Willem Clifford Cocq von Brougel broke into Ciechanów and, after a street battle, captured the city. The XVII Reserve Corps approached Nasielsk, creating a threat of a breakthrough east of Novogeorgievsk. The German XI Corps advanced to the Gołymin-Ośrodek, and the 50th Reserve Division broke through the positions of the Russian 30th Infantry Division near Kurowo, throwing its scattered units back to the village Łukowo. The 2nd brigade of the 14th cavalry division, thrown into a counterattack on horseback, was almost completely destroyed by the concentrated small arms and machine-gun fire of the German 229th reserve infantry regiment; the commander of the 14th Hussar Mitavsky Regiment, Major General A. Westfalen, died, but the advance of the Germans was halted.

The 1st and 2nd Siberian Rifle Divisions successfully repulsed the attacks of the XIII Corps, but the XVII Reserve Corps captured the redoubt at Bobowo and took up to 1,000 Russian prisoners. German troops broke into Gmina Krasnosielc, repulsed by a counterattack of the 10th Siberian Rifle Division. After the retreat under the onslaught of the German 8th Army and the 1st Army Corps of the left flank of the Russian 12th Army, the German XIII Corps captured the crossings over the Orzyca, and A. Litvinov at 13 o'clock ordered the immediate retreat of the entire 1st Army. However, it was not possible to break away from the German army.

The withdrawal of Russian troops to new positions was completed on the morning of July 17. For 4 days of fighting, 88 officers and 17,544 soldiers fell into German captivity, 13 guns, 40 machine guns, 7 mortars were lost.

On July 17, A. Litvinov reinforced the right flank of the army with the 21st Army Corps transferred to him by M. Alekseyev, and concentrated the 1st Cavalry Corps behind the center. The headquarters of the North-Western Front was against sending the 27th Army Corps to Novogeorgievsk and declared it a reserve; instead, the 63rd Infantry Division from the 3rd Army was sent to the fortress. From the 2nd Army, the 1st Rifle Brigade was sent to Wyszków. The defense in front of Narew River was significantly strengthened, but time was needed for the arrival of all troops.

The Hindenburg's intervention in the operational plan of Gallwitz led to a change in the direction of the blow: it was shifted to the east, towards Ostrołęka. As a result, the German XIII, XVII Reserve and XI Corps advanced against the reinforced 1st Siberian Army Corps (in the afternoon a section of the 4th Army Corps was allocated from Kołaki to Tarnowo. To provide assistance, A. Churin sent the 1st Cavalry Brigade to the Siberians. During the day, reinforced by the incoming 33rd Infantry Division, the 2nd Siberian Rifle Division staunchly defended the position, the 14th Cavalry Division took advantage of the slow passage of the Germans through Orzyca River to strengthen the trenches, but the 30th Infantry and 1st Siberian Rifle Divisions were again shot down from positions and retreated.

At 13-00 Litvinov ordered to retreat beyond the Narew, but after 15 minutes canceled the order, as the 44th Infantry Division and the 1st Cavalry Corps were approaching the front. However, after 15-00, the Germans broke through to the rear of the 1st Siberian division, knocked down the 14th cavalry and 30th infantry divisions of the 4th Army Corps from their positions and pressed the 1st Turkestan Army Corps. After an unsuccessful counterattack by the 40th Infantry Division, Litvinov at 18.30 again ordered the withdrawal of units of the 1st Siberian Army Corps across the Narew River.

During July 18, the Gallwitz's group advanced after the retreating troops of the Russian 1st Army and reached the fortifications of Novogeorgievsk with the right wing, and the approaches to Ostrołęka with the left. In total, during the first phase of the Bug–Narew offensive, the Germans lost more than 20,000 men and captured 24,000 Russians as prisoners, 56 machine guns, 14 guns. The total Russian casualties exceeded 40,000 men.

== See also ==
- Bug-Narew Offensive

== Literature ==
- Олейников, Алексей (2016). Россия-щит Антанты. С предисловием Николая Старикова. St. Petersburg: Питер. ISBN 978-5-496-01795-4.
- "Sanitätsbericht über das Deutsche Heer (Deutsches Feld- und Besatzungsheer) im Weltkriege 1914/1918, III. Bund" (in German). Berlin: Mittler. 1934.
- Gallwitz, Max von (1929). Meine Führertätigkeit im Weltkriege 1914-1916 : Belgien, Osten, Balkan (in German). Berlin: E. S. Mittler & Sohn.
- Корольков Г.К Несбывшиеся Канны.–М.,1926
- Г.К. Корольков, Праснышское сражение. Июль 1915
- С.Г. Нелипович, Русский фронт Первой мировой войны. Потери сторон 1915, 2022
