= XI Corps (German Empire) =

XI Army Corps XI. Armee-Korps
- Flag of the Staff of a Generalkommando (1871–1918)
- Active: 30 October 1866–1919
- Country: Prussia / German Empire
- Type: Corps
- Size: Approximately 44,000 (on mobilisation in 1914)
- Garrison/HQ: Kassel/Bellevue Palace, Schöne Aussicht 5
- Shoulder strap piping: Red
- Engagements: Franco-Prussian War Battle of Wissembourg Battle of Wörth Battle of Sedan World War I Battle of the Frontiers First Battle of the Masurian Lakes Battle of the Vistula River German summer offensive 1915 Bug–Narew Offensive Second battle of Przasnysz Narew Offensive Battle of Amiens

Insignia
- Abbreviation: XI AK

The XI Army Corps / XI AK (German: XI. Armee-Korps) was a corps level command of the Prussian and German Armies before and during World War I.

XI Corps was one of three formed in the aftermath of the Austro-Prussian War (the others being IX Corps and X Corps). The Corps was formed in October 1866 with headquarters in Kassel. The catchment area included the newly annexed Province of Hesse-Nassau and the Thuringian principalities (Saxe-Weimar, Saxe-Meiningen, Saxe-Coburg and Gotha and Waldeck).

During the Franco-Prussian War it was assigned to the 3rd Army.

The Corps was assigned to the VI Army Inspectorate but joined the predominantly Saxon 3rd Army at the start of the First World War. It was still in existence at the end of the war in the 6th Army, Heeresgruppe Kronprinz Rupprecht on the Western Front. The Corps was disbanded with the demobilisation of the German Army after World War I.

== Franco-Prussian War ==
During the Franco-Prussian War, the corps formed part of the 3rd Army. It participated in the battles of Wissembourg, Wörth and Sedan.

== Between the wars ==
Initially, the Corps commanded the 21st Division in Frankfurt and the 22nd Division in Kassel. In 1871 they were joined by the Grand Ducal Hessian 25th Division in Darmstadt. As the German Army expanded in the latter part of the 19th Century, a new XVIII Corps was formed on 1 April 1899 and took command of the 21st and 25th Divisions. The 38th Division was formed at Erfurt on the same date and joined the Corps.

The Corps was assigned to the VI Army Inspectorate but joined the predominantly Saxon 3rd Army at the start of the First World War.

=== Peacetime organisation ===
The 25 peacetime Corps of the German Army (Guards, I - XXI, I - III Bavarian) had a reasonably standardised organisation. Each consisted of two divisions with usually two infantry brigades, one field artillery brigade and a cavalry brigade each. Each brigade normally consisted of two regiments of the appropriate type, so each Corps normally commanded 8 infantry, 4 field artillery and 4 cavalry regiments. There were exceptions to this rule:

V, VI, VII, IX and XIV Corps each had a 5th infantry brigade (so 10 infantry regiments)
II, XIII, XVIII and XXI Corps had a 9th infantry regiment
I, VI and XVI Corps had a 3rd cavalry brigade (so 6 cavalry regiments)
the Guards Corps had 11 infantry regiments (in 5 brigades) and 8 cavalry regiments (in 4 brigades).

Each Corps also directly controlled a number of other units. This could include one or more

Foot Artillery Regiment
Jäger Battalion
Pioneer Battalion
Train Battalion

Peacetime organization of the Corps
Corps	Division	Brigade	Units	Garrison
XI Corps	22nd Division	43rd Infantry Brigade	82nd (2nd Kurhessian) Infantry	Göttingen
XI Corps	22nd Division	43rd Infantry Brigade	83rd (3rd Kurhessian) Infantry "von Wittich"	Kassel, III Bn at Arolsen
XI Corps	22nd Division	44th Infantry Brigade	32nd (2nd Thuringian) Infantry	Meiningen
XI Corps	22nd Division	44th Infantry Brigade	167th (1st Upper Alsatian) Infantry	Kassel, III Bn at Mühlhausen
XI Corps	22nd Division	22nd Field Artillery Brigade	11th (1st Kurhessian) Field Artillery	Kassel, Fritzlar
XI Corps	22nd Division	22nd Field Artillery Brigade	47th (2nd Kurhessian) Field Artillery	Fulda
XI Corps	22nd Division	22nd Cavalry Brigade	5th (Rhenish) Dragoons "Baron Manteuffel"	Hofgeismar
XI Corps	22nd Division	22nd Cavalry Brigade	14th (2nd Kurhessian) Hussars "Landgrave Frederick II of Hesse-Homburg"	Kassel
XI Corps	38th Division	76th Infantry Brigade	71st (3rd Thuringian) Infantry	Erfurt, I Bn at Sondershausen
XI Corps	38th Division	76th Infantry Brigade	95th (6th Thuringian) Infantry	Gotha, II Bn at Hildburghausen, III Bn at Coburg
XI Corps	38th Division	83rd Infantry Brigade	94th (5th Thuringian) Infantry "Grand Duke of Saxony"	Weimar, II Bn at Eisenach, III Bn at Jena
XI Corps	38th Division	83rd Infantry Brigade	96th (7th Thuringian) Infantry	Gera, III Bn at Rudolstadt
XI Corps	38th Division	38th Field Artillery Brigade	19th (1st Thuringian) Field Artillery	Erfurt
XI Corps	38th Division	38th Field Artillery Brigade	55th (2nd Thuringian) Field Artillery	Naumburg an der Saale
XI Corps	38th Division	38th Cavalry Brigade	2nd Jäger zu Pferde	Langensalza
XI Corps	38th Division	38th Cavalry Brigade	6th Jäger zu Pferde	Erfurt
XI Corps	Corps Troops		11th (Kurhessian) Jäger Battalion	Marburg
XI Corps	Corps Troops		6th Machine Gun Abteilung	Metz
XI Corps	Corps Troops		18th (Thuringian) Foot Artillery	Niederzwehren bei Kassel
XI Corps	Corps Troops		11th (Kurhessian) Pioneer Battalion	Hannoversch Münden
XI Corps	Corps Troops		11th (Kurhessian) Train Battalion	Kassel
XI Corps	Erfurt Defence Command (Landwehr-Inspektion)			Erfurt

== World War I ==
=== Organisation on mobilisation ===
On mobilization on 2 August 1914 the Corps was restructured. 38th Cavalry Brigade was withdrawn to form part of the 8th Cavalry Division and the 22nd Cavalry Brigade was withdrawn to form part of the 3rd Cavalry Division. The 6th Cuirassiers, formerly of the III Corps, was raised to a strength of 6 squadrons before being split into two half-regiments of 3 squadrons each. The half-regiments were assigned as divisional cavalry to 22nd and 38th Divisions. Divisions received engineer companies and other support units from the Corps headquarters. In summary, XI Corps mobilised with 25 infantry battalions, 9 machine gun companies (54 machine guns), 6 cavalry squadrons, 24 field artillery batteries (144 guns), 4 heavy artillery batteries (16 guns), 3 pioneer companies and an aviation detachment.

Initial wartime organization of the Corps
Corps	Division	Brigade	Units
XI Corps	22nd Division	43rd Infantry Brigade	82nd Infantry Regiment
XI Corps	22nd Division	43rd Infantry Brigade	83rd Infantry Regiment
XI Corps	22nd Division	44th Infantry Brigade	32nd Infantry Regiment
XI Corps	22nd Division	44th Infantry Brigade	167th Infantry Regiment
XI Corps	22nd Division	44th Infantry Brigade	11th Jäger Battalion
XI Corps	22nd Division	22nd Field Artillery Brigade	11th Field Artillery Regiment
XI Corps	22nd Division	22nd Field Artillery Brigade	47th Field Artillery Regiment
XI Corps	22nd Division		staff and half of 6th Cuirassier Regiment
XI Corps	22nd Division		1st Company, 11th Pioneer Battalion
XI Corps	22nd Division		22nd Divisional Pontoon Train
XI Corps	22nd Division		1st Medical Company
XI Corps	22nd Division		3rd Medical Company
XI Corps	38th Division	76th Infantry Brigade	71st Infantry Regiment
XI Corps	38th Division	76th Infantry Brigade	95th Infantry Regiment
XI Corps	38th Division	83rd Infantry Brigade	94th Infantry Regiment
XI Corps	38th Division	83rd Infantry Brigade	96th Infantry Regiment
XI Corps	38th Division	38th Field Artillery Brigade	19th Field Artillery Regiment
XI Corps	38th Division	38th Field Artillery Brigade	55th Field Artillery Regiment
XI Corps	38th Division		half of 6th Cuirassier Regiment
XI Corps	38th Division		2nd Company, 11th Pioneer Battalion
XI Corps	38th Division		3rd Company, 11th Pioneer Battalion
XI Corps	38th Division		38th Divisional Pontoon Train
XI Corps	38th Division		2nd Medical Company
XI Corps	Corps Troops		I Battalion, 18th Foot Artillery Regiment
XI Corps	Corps Troops		28th Aviation Detachment
XI Corps	Corps Troops		11th Corps Pontoon Train
XI Corps	Corps Troops		11th Telephone Detachment
XI Corps	Corps Troops		11th Pioneer Searchlight Section
XI Corps	Corps Troops		Munition Trains and Columns corresponding to II Corps

=== Combat chronicle ===
The Corps was assigned to the VI Army Inspectorate in peacetime but joined the predominantly Saxon 3rd Army at the start of the First World War forming part of the right wing of the forces for the Schlieffen Plan offensive in August 1914 on the Western Front. It participated in the capture of Namur and was immediately transferred to the Eastern Front to join the 8th Army in time to participate in the First Battle of the Masurian Lakes. It was then transferred to the 9th Army and took part in the Battle of the Vistula River and then in the Bug–Narew Offensive.

It returned to the Western Front at the end of 1915.

It was still in existence at the end of the war in the 6th Army, Heeresgruppe Kronprinz Rupprecht on the Western Front.

== Commanders ==
The XI Corps had the following commanders during its existence:

From	Rank	Name
30 October 1866	General der Infanterie	Heinrich Ludwig von Plonski
18 July 1870	General der Infanterie	Julius von Bose
6 April 1880	General der Kavallerie	Ludwig Karl von Schlotheim
22 March 1889	General der Infanterie	Wilhelm Hermann von Grolman
11 August 1892	General der Infanterie	Adolf von Wittich
24 April 1904	General der Infanterie	Wilhelm von Linde-Suden
24 September 1905	General der Kavallerie	Albrecht, Duke of Württemberg
25 February 1908	General der Infanterie	Reinhard von Scheffer-Boyadel
1 January 1914	General der Infanterie	Otto von Plüskow
12 March 1917	Generalleutnant	Viktor Kühne
27 August 1917	General der Infanterie	Franz Freiherr von Soden
21 November 1917	Generalleutnant	Viktor Kühne

== See also ==
- Franco-Prussian War order of battle
- German Army order of battle (1914)
- German Army order of battle, Western Front (1918)
- List of Imperial German infantry regiments
- List of Imperial German artillery regiments
- List of Imperial German cavalry regiments

== Bibliography ==
- Cron, Hermann (2002). Imperial German Army 1914-18: Organisation, Structure, Orders-of-Battle [first published: 1937]. Helion & Co. ISBN 1-874622-70-1.
- Ellis, John; Cox, Michael (1993). The World War I Databook. Aurum Press Ltd. ISBN 1-85410-766-6.
- Haythornthwaite, Philip J. (1996). The World War One Source Book. Arms and Armour. ISBN 1-85409-351-7.
- Histories of Two Hundred and Fifty-One Divisions of the German Army which Participated in the War (1914-1918), compiled from records of Intelligence section of the General Staff, American Expeditionary Forces, at General Headquarters, Chaumont, France 1919. The London Stamp Exchange Ltd. 1989 [1920]. ISBN 0-948130-87-3.
- The German Forces in the Field; 7th Revision, 11th November 1918; Compiled by the General Staff, War Office. Imperial War Museum, London and the Battery Press. 1995 [1918]. ISBN 978-1-870423-95-3.
