= 1st Life Hussars =

- 1. Leib-Husaren-Regiment
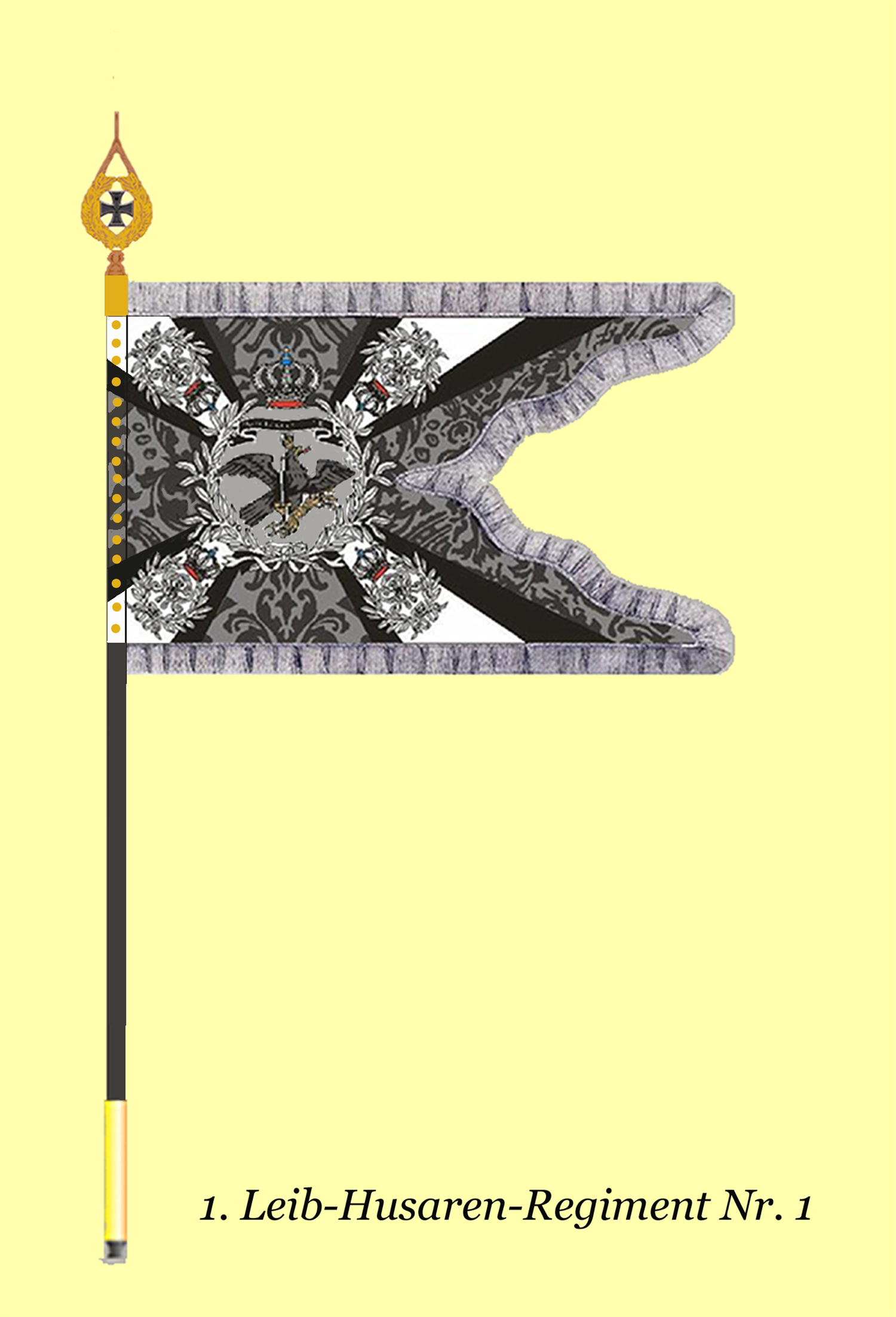
- Regimental colours of the 1st Life Hussars
- Active: 1741 – 1919
- Country: Prussia
- Allegiance: Prussian Army
- Branch: Army
- Type: Cavalry
- Part of: XVII Corps (German Empire) (from c. 1890)
- Garrison/HQ: Goldap (after 1808), Danzig (1817–1919)

Commanders
- Notable commanders: Dietrich Bogislav von Pfuhl (first); Carl von Borcke (last); August von Mackensen (honorary commander)

The 1st Life Hussars (German: 1. Leib-Husaren-Regiment), later known as the 1. Life Hussars Regiment No. 1 (German: 1. Leib-Husaren-Regiment Nr. 1) was a cavalry unit of the Prussian Army.

== History ==
On 9 August 1741, King Frederick the Great established a hussar regiment, initially designated as the Black Hussars Regiment. By September, five squadrons had been formed.

In 1744, during the War of Austrian Succession, the regiment participated in the Siege of Prague. In 1745, the unit distinguished itself while participating in engagements at Landshut and Hirschberg, where it took 300 prisoners of war. The unit also participated in the Battle of Hohenfriedberg. During the Seven Years' War, the unit covered baggage trains at the Battle of Kunersdorf. On 1 June 1758, at Emmerich, the unit captured a standard as well as a pair of kettledrums from the Bellefond Cuirassier Regiment.

In 1808, some time after the Treaty of Tilsit, the regiment was divided, and two regiments were formed: the 1st Life Hussars in Goldap, and the 2nd Life Hussars in Preußisch Stargard. The 1st Life Hussars participated in the Battle of Großbeeren and the Battle of Leipzig.

In May 1817, the unit moved to their new garrison in Danzig, with parts of its garrison in Langfuhr. It was renamed the 1st Life Hussars Regiment No. 1 on 7 May 1861. In 1893, Kaiser Wilhelm II requested that August von Mackensen be given command of the regiment from 17 June. Mackensen became à la suite after leaving its command on 27 January 1898.

=== First World War ===
During the First World War, the unit remained in brigade formation with the 2nd Life Hussars. The brigade participated in the First Battle of the Marne as well as in the fighting around Arras, and was transferred to the Eastern Front soon after. On the Eastern Front, the unit fought in Eastern Galicia as well as in the Riga offensive. In 1917, the brigade was sent to Finland to support the Whites in the Finnish Civil War. Following the Treaty of Brest-Litovsk, the unit remained as occupation troops. The unit demobilized in 1919.

== Uniforms ==
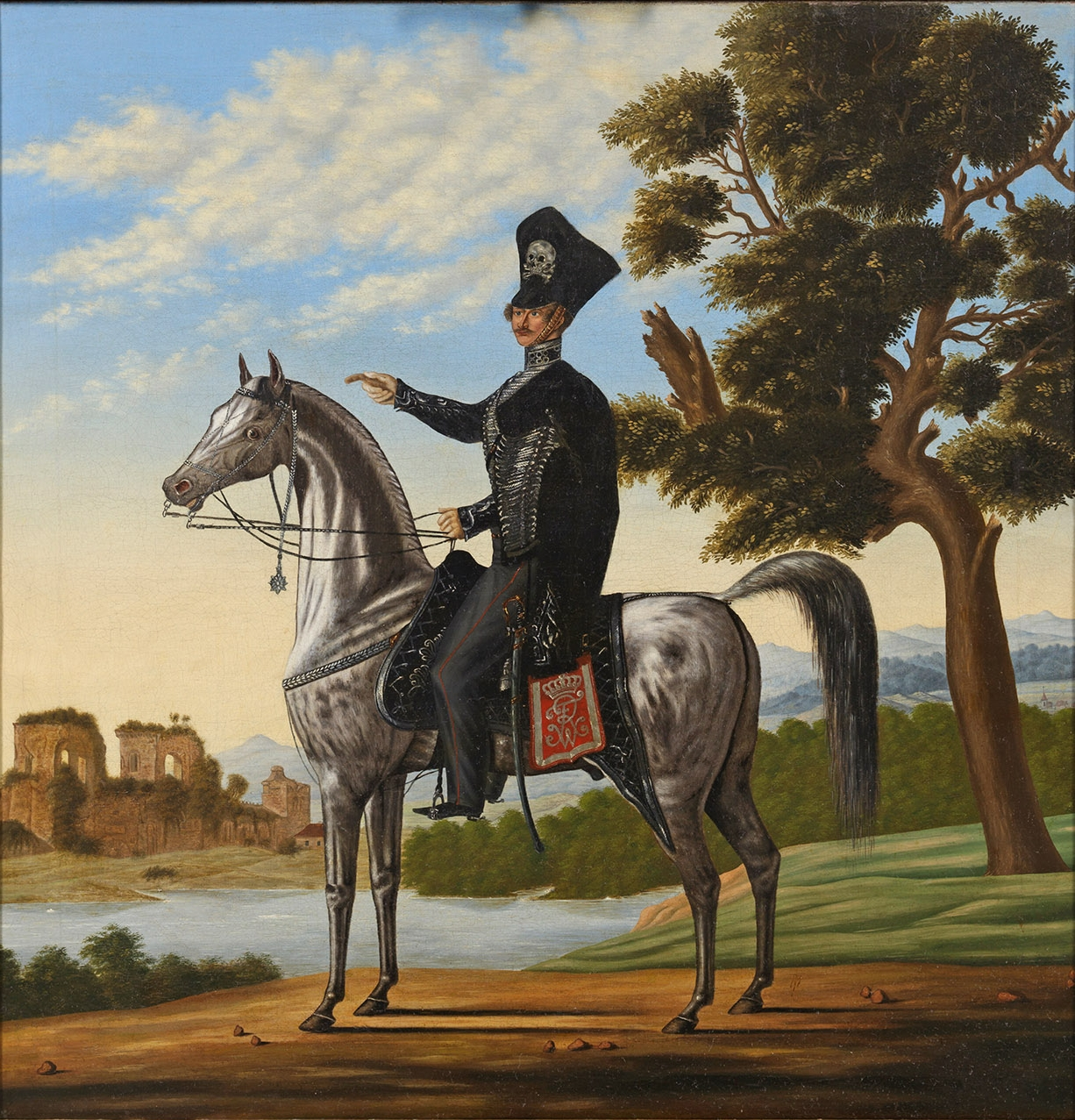
A depiction of a hussar in the uniform of the 1st Life Hussars Regiment.

When the regiment was initially formed in 1741, the regiment's distinctive dolman was initially entirely black, with white braid on the chest and cuffs. Later, the dolman featured a red collar and red cuffs. A white and red cord sash (silver with black threads for officers) was worn with the sash. The cap featured an embroidered white Totenkopf on the front. The saddlecloths had a red scalloped edge.

Following the reorganization of the Prussian Army in 1808, the uniforms and equipment of both the 1st and 2nd Life Hussars remained largely unchanged, although now the 1st Life Hussars had white shoulder straps. The cap was replaced with a shako with a nickel-silver skull, and the saddlecloth was now made of black sheepskin with a ponceau red trim. From 1815 onwards, both the 1st and 2nd Life Hussars wore shoulder cords instead of shoulder straps. At the same time, Prussian cavalry generally reverted to the saddlecloths used until around 1806.

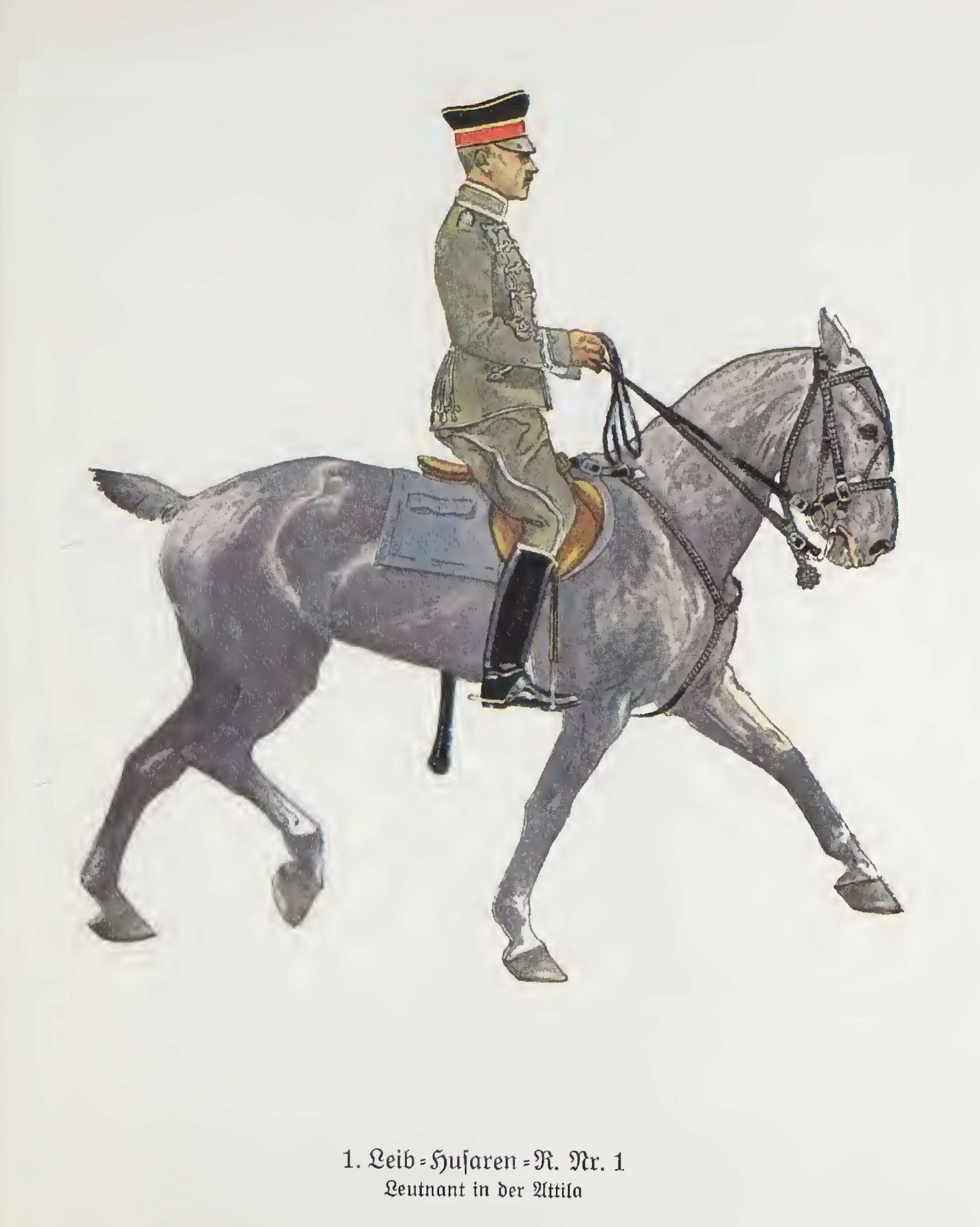
A depiction of a 1st Life Hussars trooper in 1915. By this time the 1st Life Hussars now wore the Feldgrau field service uniform.

In 1832, the collars and cuffs of all Prussian hussar regiments adopted the color of the dolman. As a result, both the 1st and 2nd Life Hussars now had black collars and cuffs. From 1836, officers wore silver lacing instead of camel cord. In 1843, all Prussian hussar regiments received black Prussian winged caps with colored wing linings. Only Life Hussar regiments and the 3rd Regiment received tall sealskin caps. In 1850, black fur caps became mandatory for all Prussian hussar regiments, although officers wore dark brown caps made of otter fur. From 1853 onwards, Prussian hussar regiments no longer wore fur caps, and fur caps were only reintroduced decades later, and were only for certain regiments.

In 1907, the uniform of the 1st Life Hussars was replaced by the Feldgrau field service uniform. The bandolier and cartridge box were no longer worn with this uniform.

== Totenkopfhusaren ==
Due to the Totenkopf on the fur and cloth caps they wore, they were often nicknamed the "Totenkopfhusaren" (death's head hussars). August von Mackensen, who was à la suite from 1898 onwards, also often wore the regiment's distinctive death's head cap.
