= Battle of Gumbinnen =

August 1914 battle of WW1's Eastern Front

- Part of Russian invasion of East Prussia during Eastern front
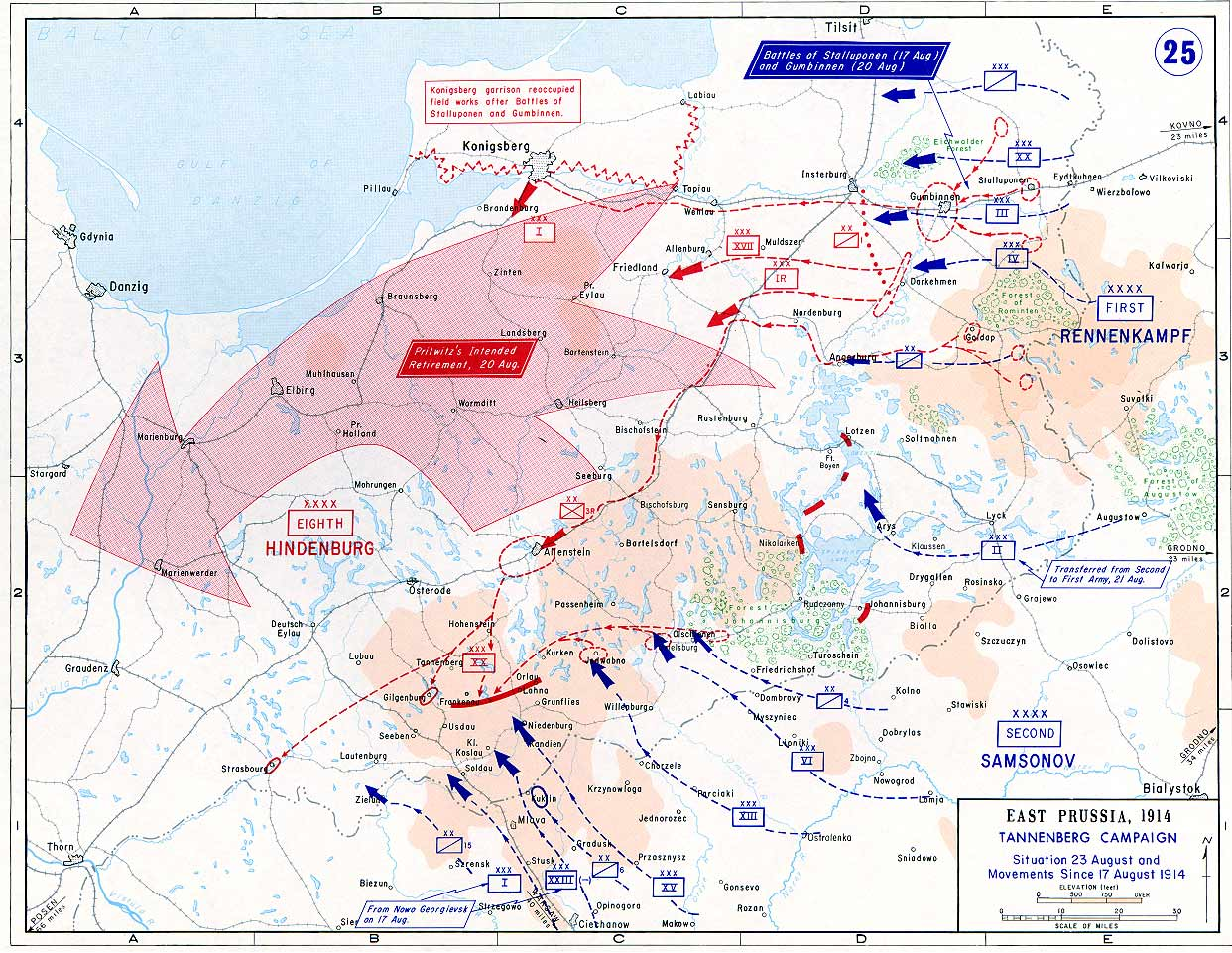
- Eastern Front, 17–23 August 1914.
| Date | 20 August [O.S. 7 August] 1914 |
| Location | Gumbinnen, East Prussia (now Gusev, Russia) 54°36′N 22°12′E |
| Result | Russian victory |

Belligerents
| German Empire | Russian Empire |

Commanders and leaders
| (German Empire) Maximilian von Prittwitz (German Empire) August von Mackensen | Paul von Rennenkampf |

Units involved
| (German Empire) 8th Army | 1st Army |

Strength
| 74,400 men 224 machine guns and 408 guns | 63,800 total 252 machine guns and 408 guns |

Casualties and losses
| 14,607 | 18,839; Another estimate: 19,665 men, including 9,500 captured |

The Battle of Gumbinnen, initiated by forces of the German Empire on 20 August 1914, was a German offensive on the Eastern Front during the First World War. Because of the hastiness of the German attack, the Russian Army emerged victorious.

== Background ==
According to Prit Buttar,

Provided that the Russians did not concentrate all their forces against East Prussia - and therefore sent substantial numbers of troops against the Austro-Hungarian Empire - Eighth Army should be able to hold out without conceding too much ground until victory over France was assured. All that was required was for Prittwitz to avoid defeat, and to hold his nerve. Originally, Prittwitz had intended to hold the line of the Angerapp and allow Rennenkampf to suffer heavy casualties while trying to force the position.

=== Opposing forces ===
- Eighth Army
  - I Corps (General der Infanterie Hermann von François)
    - 1st Division
    - 2nd Division
  - XVII Corps (General der Kavallerie August von Mackensen)
    - 35th Division
    - 36th Division
  - XX Corps (General der Artillerie Friedrich von Scholtz)
    - 37th Division
    - 41st Division
  - I Reserve Corps (Generalleutnant Otto von Below)
    - 1st Reserve Division
    - 36th Reserve Division
  - 1st Cavalry Division

The German forces faced the Russian First Army (Paul von Rennenkampf) and Russian Second Army (Alexander Samsonov). The Russians enjoyed considerable numerical superiority but were hampered by significant deficiencies in their services of supply and field communications.

German aerial reconnaissance by the Flieger Abteilung 16 indicated a gap had formed between the Russian First and Second armies, while radio intercepts indicated Rennenkampf had halted his army for a rest on 20 August. François' scouts, following his success at the Battle of Stallupönen, reported the northern flank of the Russian First Army was exposed, and requested the 2nd Division for an attack, with support by the XVII Corps and I Reserve Corps. Reluctantly agreeing, Prittwitz commented, "I Corps had made a soup for us, and we will now have to eat it up."

== German attack and retreat ==
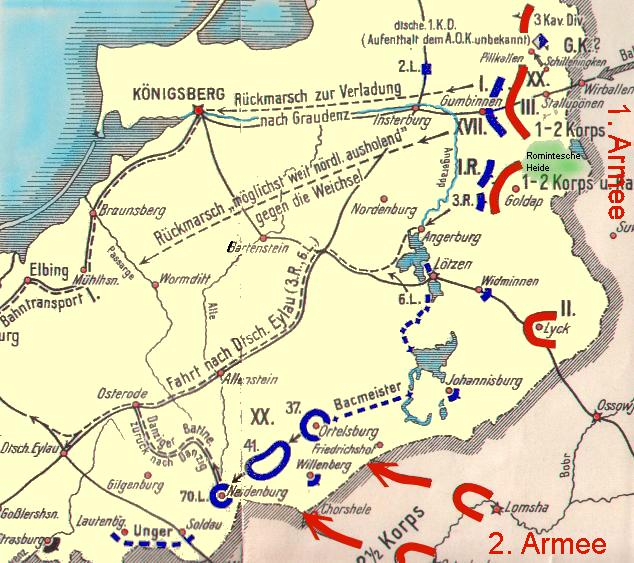
German movements

With his initial success, François had persuaded Prittwitz to launch an offensive against the Russian First Army while the Second Army was still far to the south. François argued that his troops, many of whom were native East Prussians, would be demoralized by retreating and leaving their homeland to the Russians, and that the Russians were not as strong as they appeared to be. A radio message that did not use codes supported this assessment.

On the morning of 20 August, after a night march, the German 2nd Division advanced through the Züllkinner Forest and outflanked the Russian 28th Infantry Division, having been left unprotected by Huseyn Khan Nakhchivanski's cavalry. The German 1st Division engaged the Russian 29th Infantry Division at 3:30 AM, as the German 2nd Division inflicted 60 percent casualties on the Russian 28th Infantry Division, capturing Mallwischken in the process.

To the south, Mackensen's XVII Corps and Below's I Reserve Corps were still moving up and were not ready for combat. Hearing of François's actions further north, Mackensen's 35th and 26th Divisions attacked Rennenkampf's 3rd Army Corps (Russian Empire), consisting of the 25th and 27th Infantry Divisions, at 4:30 AM. However, Below was not able to join in until noon. The Russians in this area were well aware of German intentions due to François' attack, and had spent the time preparing for the assault by moving up their heavy artillery. At first the German advance went well, but it faltered once it came under Russian artillery fire, and the Russians were able to turn the German flanks and force the enemy to retreat in disorder to the Insterburg-Angerburg lines, leaving 6,000 prisoners in Russian hands.

Meanwhile, Below's I Reserve Corps, instead of advancing on Goldap as ordered, turned north to help Mackensen. His flank was then attacked by the Russian 30th Infantry Division. The Germans were unable to advance, and support Mackensen, while both sides suffered heavy casualties. The German 3rd Reserve Division, commanded by Curt von Morgen, arrived too late on the scene to intervene.

== Aftermath ==
According to Buttar,

It had been a day of mixed fortunes. Despite suffering losses, François' two divisions had been largely successful. Mackensen's corps, by contrast, had been effectively knocked out of action; its troops streamed back in disarray, with Mackensen and his staff swept along in the flood. I Reserve Corps to the south had acquitted itself well, but had ended just short of a decisive success. The German hopes of a swift victory, allowing them to turn triumphantly against Samsonov's Second Army in the south, looked increasingly forlorn.

Only Friedrich von Scholtz's XX Corps opposed Samsonov's Second Army.

Prittwitz suffered a lack of confidence, especially when he learned that reconnaissance showed the Russian Second Army consisted of five corps, and a cavalry division, with six of those Russian divisions about to cross the border and move towards Mlawa. Telephoning Moltke, Prittwitz stated that he intended on retreating to the Vistula. Moltke responded with anger since the German strategy of defending against one Russian army and then moving to confront the second army was now at risk. A retreat to the Vistula could allow both Russian armies to combine. Eventually, Prittwitz changed his mind and decided instead to attack the Russian Second Army. A change from facing an army to the east, to an army in the south had been rehearsed by the Germans during war games.

François's I Corps, joined by the 3rd Reserve Division, would move by train to the west of XX Corps. The I Reserve Corps and XVII Corps would withdraw westwards. In the meantime, Samsonov was delayed in his advance because of the lack of good railways and roads, and Rennenkampf was slow to pursue the withdrawal because of his losses and limited supplies. As Mackensen commented,

I had the strong impression that my corps had not been outfought, nor had it suffered such heavy losses. In complete calm and good order and without any interference by the enemy, it made its withdrawal.

Prittwitz's panic affected Moltke, who feared that Berlin itself could now be threatened by the advancing Russians. On 21 August, Moltke decided to replace Prittwitz and his chief of staff Georg von Waldersee. Paul von Hindenburg and Erich Ludendorff assumed their roles on 22 August. Prittwitz became the first army commander to be dismissed in World War I.
