= 36th Reserve Division =

36th Reserve Division (36. Reserve-Division)
- Active: 1914-1919
- Country: Prussia/Germany
- Branch: Army
- Type: Infantry
- Size: Approx. 15,000
- Engagements: World War I: Battle of Gumbinnen, Battle of Tannenberg (1914), First Battle of the Masurian Lakes, Gorlice-Tarnów Offensive

The 36th Reserve Division (36. Reserve-Division) was a unit of the Imperial German Army, in World War I. The division was formed on the mobilization of the German Army in August 1914 and was disbanded during the demobilization of the German Army after World War I. The division was a reserve division of the I Reserve Corps and was raised primarily in Pomerania Province and West Prussia Province.

== Combat chronicle ==
The 36th Reserve Division began the war on the Eastern Front. It fought in the Battle of Gumbinnen, the Battle of Tannenberg, and the First Battle of the Masurian Lakes. In 1915, it saw action in the Gorlice-Tarnów Offensive. It remained in the Baltic region until September 1916, and then went to Galicia. In May 1917, the division was transferred to the Western Front, arriving in June. It was deployed to various parts of the line until war's end, spending most of 1918 in the Flanders region. Allied intelligence rated the division as third class in 1918.

== Order of battle on mobilization ==
The order of battle of the 36th Reserve Division on mobilization was as follows:

- 69.Reserve-Infanterie-Brigade
  - Reserve-Infanterie-Regiment Nr. 21
  - Reserve-Infanterie-Regiment Nr. 61
  - Reserve-Jäger-Bataillon Nr. 2
- 70.Reserve-Infanterie-Brigade
  - Infanterie-Regiment von der Goltz (7. Pommersches) Nr. 54
  - Reserve-Infanterie-Regiment Nr. 5
- Reserve-Husaren-Regiment Nr. 1
- Reserve-Feldartillerie-Regiment Nr. 36
- 1.Reserve-Kompanie/Pommersches Pionier-Bataillon Nr. 2

== Order of battle on March 28, 1918 ==
The 36th Reserve Division was triangularized in September 1916. Over the course of the war, other changes took place, including the formation of the artillery and signals commands. The order of battle on April 11, 1918, was as follows:

- 69.Reserve-Infanterie-Brigade
  - Reserve-Infanterie-Regiment Nr. 5
  - Infanterie-Regiment von der Goltz (7. Pommersches) Nr. 54
  - Reserve-Infanterie-Regiment Nr. 61
  - Reserve-Jäger-Bataillon Nr. 2
- 5.Eskadron/Garde-Dragoner-Regiment Königin Viktoria von Groß Britannien u. Irland Nr. 1
- Artillerie-Kommandeur 72
  - Reserve-Feldartillerie-Regiment Nr. 36
  - III.Bataillon/Reserve-Fußartillerie-Regiment Nr. 4
- Stab Pommersches Pionier-Bataillon Nr. 2
  - 1.Kompanie/Pommersches Pionier-Bataillon Nr. 2
  - 1.Reserve-Kompanie/Pommersches Pionier-Bataillon Nr. 2
  - Minenwerfer-Kompanie Nr. 236
- Divisions-Nachrichten-Kommandeur 436
