= 35th Division (German Empire) =

35th Division (35. Division); from August 2, 1914, 35th Infantry Division (35. Infanterie-Division)
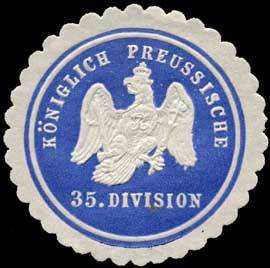
- A Sealing Stamp of the 35th Division
- Active: 1 April 1890–1919
- Country: Prussia/Germany
- Branch: Imperial German Army
- Type: Infantry (in peacetime included cavalry)
- Size: Approx. 15,000 men
- Part of: XVII. Army Corps (XVII. Armeekorps)
- Garrison/HQ: Graudenz (1890-1912); Thorn (1912-1918)
- Engagements: World War I: Eastern Front; Battle of Gumbinnen; Battle of Tannenberg; First Battle of the Masurian Lakes; Gorlice-Tarnów Offensive; Western Front; Battle of the Somme; Battle of Arras; Battle of Passchendaele; Hundred Days Offensive

The 35th Division (35. Division) was a unit of the Prussian/German Army. It was formed on April 1, 1890, and was headquartered initially in Graudenz (now Grudziądz, Poland) and from 1912 in Thorn (now Toruń, Poland). The division was subordinated in peacetime to the XVII Army Corps (XVII. Armeekorps). The division was disbanded in 1919 during the demobilization of the German Army after World War I. The division was recruited primarily in the southern part of West Prussia, and included a relatively high percentage of Poles.

== Combat chronicle ==
The 35th Infantry Division began World War I on the Eastern Front. It fought in the battles of Gumbinnen and Tannenberg, and in the First Battle of the Masurian Lakes. In 1915, it participated in the Gorlice-Tarnów Offensive. In October 1915, it was transferred to the Western Front. In 1916, it fought in the Battle of the Somme. In 1917, it participated in the Battle of Arras and the Battle of Passchendaele. In 1918, the division fought against various Allied offensives and counteroffensives, including the Hundred Days Offensive. Allied intelligence rated the division as a mediocre division and considered it second class by 1918, mainly due to the losses it had suffered in the war's earlier battles.

== Pre-World War I organization ==
The organization of the 35th Division in 1914, shortly before the outbreak of World War I, was as follows:

- 70. Infanterie-Brigade
  - Infanterie-Regiment von Borcke (4. Pommersches) Nr. 21
  - Infanterie-Regiment von der Marwitz (8. Pommersches) Nr. 61
- 87. Infanterie-Brigade
  - Kulmer Infanterie-Regiment Nr. 141
  - 9. Westpreußisches Infanterie-Regiment Nr. 176
- 35. Kavallerie-Brigade
  - Husaren-Regiment Fürst Blücher von Wahlstatt (Pommersches) Nr. 5
  - Jäger-Regiment zu Pferde Nr. 4
- 35. Feldartillerie-Brigade
  - Feldartillerie-Regiment Nr. 71 Großkomtur
  - Thorner Feldartillerie-Regiment Nr. 81
- Landwehr-Inspektion Graudenz

== Order of battle on mobilization ==
On mobilization in August 1914 at the beginning of World War I, most divisional cavalry, including brigade headquarters, was withdrawn to form cavalry divisions or split up among divisions as reconnaissance units. Divisions received engineer companies and other support units from their higher headquarters. The 35th Division was redesignated the 35th Infantry Division. Its initial wartime organization was as follows:

- 70. Infanterie-Brigade
  - Infanterie-Regiment von Borcke (4. Pommersches) Nr. 21
  - Infanterie-Regiment von der Marwitz (8. Pommersches) Nr. 61
- 87. Infanterie-Brigade
  - Kulmer Infanterie-Regiment Nr. 141
  - 9. Westpreußisches Infanterie-Regiment Nr. 176
- Jäger-Regiment zu Pferde Nr. 4
- 35. Feldartillerie-Brigade
  - Feldartillerie-Regiment Nr. 71 Großkomtur
  - Thorner Feldartillerie-Regiment Nr. 81
- 1.Kompanie/1. Westpreußisches Pionier-Bataillon Nr. 17

== Late World War I organization ==
Divisions underwent many changes during the war, with regiments moving from division to division, and some being destroyed and rebuilt. During the war, most divisions became triangular - one infantry brigade with three infantry regiments rather than two infantry brigades of two regiments (a "square division"). An artillery commander replaced the artillery brigade headquarters, the cavalry was further reduced, the engineer contingent was increased, and a divisional signals command was created. The 35th Infantry Division's order of battle on March 28, 1918, was as follows:

- 87. Infanterie-Brigade
  - Infanterie-Regiment von der Marwitz (8. Pommersches) Nr. 61
  - Kulmer Infanterie-Regiment Nr. 141
  - 9. Westpreußisches Infanterie-Regiment Nr. 176
  - Maschinengewehr-Scharfschützen-Abteilung Nr. 46
- 2.Eskadron/Husaren-Regiment Fürst Blücher von Wahlstatt (Pommersches) Nr. 5
- Artillerie-Kommandeur 35
  - Feldartillerie-Regiment Nr. 71 Großkomtur
  - I.Bataillon/Reserve-Feldartillerie-Regiment Nr. 18
- Stab Pionier-Bataillon Nr. 133:
  - 1.Kompanie/1. Westpreußisches Pionier-Bataillon Nr. 17
  - 2.Kompanie/1. Westpreußisches Pionier-Bataillon Nr. 17
  - Minenwerfer-Kompanie Nr. 35
- Divisions-Nachrichten-Kommandeur 35
