= 36th Division (German Empire) =

36th Division (36. Division); from August 2, 1914, 36th Infantry Division (36. Infanterie-Division)
- Active: 1890-1919
- Country: Prussia/Germany
- Branch: Army
- Type: Infantry (in peacetime included cavalry)
- Size: Approx. 15,000
- Part of: XVII. Army Corps (XVII. Armeekorps)
- Garrison/HQ: Danzig
- Engagements: World War I: Gumbinnen, Tannenberg, 1st Masurian Lakes, Gorlice-Tarnów Offensive, Somme, Arras (1917), Passchendaele, German spring offensive, St. Quentin, 2nd Marne, Hundred Days Offensive

The 36th Division (36. Division) was a unit of the Prussian/German Army. It was formed on April 1, 1890, and was headquartered in Danzig (now Gdańsk, Poland). The division was subordinated in peacetime to the XVII Army Corps (XVII. Armeekorps). The division was disbanded in 1919 during the demobilization of the German Army after World War I. The division was recruited primarily in West Prussia.

== Combat chronicle ==
The 36th Infantry Division began World War I on the Eastern Front. It fought in the battles of Gumbinnen and Tannenberg, and in the First Battle of the Masurian Lakes. In 1915, it participated in the Gorlice-Tarnów Offensive. In October 1915, it was transferred to the Western Front. In 1916, it fought in the Battle of the Somme. In 1917, it participated in the Battle of Arras and the Battle of Passchendaele. In 1918, the division fought in the German spring offensive, including the Battle of St. Quentin, also known as the First Battle of the Somme 1918 (and occasionally as the Second Battle of the Somme, after the 1916 battle). It then fought in the Second Battle of the Marne and defended against various Allied offensives and counteroffensives, including the Hundred Days Offensive. Allied intelligence rated the division as an excellent combat division but considered it second class by 1918, mainly due to the losses it suffered during that year's battles.

== Pre-World War I organization ==
The organization of the 36th Division in 1914, shortly before the outbreak of World War I, was as follows:

- 69. Infanterie-Brigade
  - 3. Westpreußisches Infanterie-Regiment Nr. 129
  - 8. Westpreußisches Infanterie-Regiment Nr. 175
- 71. Infanterie-Brigade
  - Grenadier-Regiment König Friedrich I (4. Ostpreußisches) Nr. 5
  - Danziger Infanterie-Regiment Nr. 128
- Leib-Husaren-Brigade
  - 1. Leib-Husaren-Regiment Nr. 1
  - 2. Leib-Husaren-Regiment Königin Victoria von Preußen Nr. 2
- 36. Feldartillerie-Brigade
  - 2. Westpreußisches Feldartillerie-Regiment Nr. 36
  - Feldartillerie-Regiment Nr. 72 Hochmeister

== Order of battle on mobilization ==
On mobilization in August 1914 at the beginning of World War I, most divisional cavalry, including brigade headquarters, was withdrawn to form cavalry divisions or split up among divisions as reconnaissance units. Divisions received engineer companies and other support units from their higher headquarters. The 36th Division was redesignated the 36th Infantry Division. Its initial wartime organization was as follows:

- 69. Infanterie-Brigade
  - 3. Westpreußisches Infanterie-Regiment Nr. 129
  - 8. Westpreußisches Infanterie-Regiment Nr. 175
- 71. Infanterie-Brigade
  - Grenadier-Regiment König Friedrich I (4. Ostpreußisches) Nr. 5
  - Danziger Infanterie-Regiment Nr. 128
- Husaren-Regiment Fürst Blücher von Wahlstatt (Pommersches) Nr. 5
- 36. Feldartillerie-Brigade
  - 2. Westpreußisches Feldartillerie-Regiment Nr. 36
  - Feldartillerie-Regiment Nr. 72 Hochmeister
- 2.Kompanie/1. Westpreußisches Pionier-Bataillon Nr. 17
- 3.Kompanie/1. Westpreußisches Pionier-Bataillon Nr. 17

== Late World War I organization ==
Divisions underwent many changes during the war, with regiments moving from division to division, and some being destroyed and rebuilt. During the war, most divisions became triangular - one infantry brigade with three infantry regiments rather than two infantry brigades of two regiments (a "square division"). An artillery commander replaced the artillery brigade headquarters, the cavalry was further reduced, the engineer contingent was increased, and a divisional signals command was created. The 36th Infantry Division's order of battle on March 20, 1918, was as follows:

- 71.Infanterie-Brigade
  - Grenadier-Regiment König Friedrich I (4. Ostpreußisches) Nr. 5
  - Danziger Infanterie-Regiment Nr. 128
  - 8. Westpreußisches Infanterie-Regiment Nr. 175
  - Maschinengewehr-Scharfschützen-Abteilung Nr. 64
- 4.Eskadron/Husaren-Regiment von Schill (1. Schlesisches) Nr. 4
- Artillerie-Kommandeur 36:
  - 2. Westpreußisches Feldartillerie-Regiment Nr. 36
  - I.Bataillon/Reserve-Fußartillerie-Regiment Nr. 4
- Stab Pionier-Bataillon Nr. 17
  - 3.Kompanie/1. Westpreußisches Pionier-Bataillon Nr. 17
  - 5.Kompanie/1. Westpreußisches Pionier-Bataillon Nr. 17
  - Minenwerfer-Kompanie Nr. 36
- Divisions-Nachrichten-Kommandeur 36
