= XIII (Royal Württemberg) Corps =

XIII (Royal Württemberg) Army Corps XIII. (Königlich Württembergisches) Armee-Korps
- Flag of the Staff of a Generalkommando (1871–1918)
- Active: 1817–1919
- Country: Württemberg / German Empire
- Type: Corps
- Size: Approximately 44,000 (on mobilisation in 1914)
- Garrison/HQ: Stuttgart/Villa Bohnenberger, Olgastraße 11
- Patron: King of Württemberg
- Shoulder strap piping: Red
- Engagements: Austro-Prussian War Tauberbischofsheim Franco-Prussian War Battle of Wörth Battle of Sedan Siege of Paris World War I Battle of the Frontiers Race to the Sea Battle of Mont Sorrel German summer offensive 1915 Bug–Narew Offensive Second battle of Przasnysz Narew Offensive

Insignia
- Abbreviation: XIII AK

The XIII (Royal Württemberg) Army Corps / XIII AK (German: XIII. (Königlich Württembergisches) Armee-Korps) was a corps of the Imperial German Army. It was, effectively, also the army of the Kingdom of Württemberg, which had been integrated in 1871 into the Prussian Army command structure, as had the armies of most German states. The corps was originally established as the Württemberg Corps Command (Korpskommando) in 1817. It became the XIII Army Corps when it was integrated into the Prussian numbering system on December 18, 1871, shortly after the Franco-Prussian War.

== Austro-Prussian War ==
The corps saw action in the 1866 Austro-Prussian War, on the losing Austrian side, as the Royal Württemberg Division of the VIII German Federation Army Corps (VIII. deutschen Bundesarmeekorps). It was unable to stop a Prussian advance into north Württemberg at Tauberbischofsheim, but this battle was not important in the war.

== Franco-Prussian War ==
In the Franco-Prussian War of 1870-71, the corps served under the headquarters staff of the Württemberg Field Division of the Combined Württemberg-Baden Army Corps. The Württemberg Field Division saw action in the battles of Wörth and Sedan, and in the Siege of Paris.

== Peacetime organisation ==
The corps' two divisions were the 26th and 27th.

The 25 peacetime Corps of the German Army (Guards, I - XXI, I - III Bavarian) had a reasonably standardised organisation. Each consisted of two divisions with usually two infantry brigades, one field artillery brigade and a cavalry brigade each. Each brigade normally consisted of two regiments of the appropriate type, so each Corps normally commanded 8 infantry, 4 field artillery and 4 cavalry regiments. There were exceptions to this rule:

V, VI, VII, IX and XIV Corps each had a 5th infantry brigade (so 10 infantry regiments)
II, XIII, XVIII and XXI Corps had a 9th infantry regiment
I, VI and XVI Corps had a 3rd cavalry brigade (so 6 cavalry regiments)
the Guards Corps had 11 infantry regiments (in 5 brigades) and 8 cavalry regiments (in 4 brigades).

Each Corps also directly controlled a number of other units. This could include one or more

Foot Artillery Regiment
Jäger Battalion

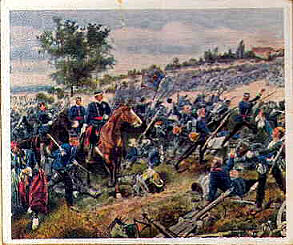
Württemberg troops attack at Wörth, 1870

Pioneer Battalion
Train Battalion

Peacetime organization of the Corps
Corps	Division	Brigade	Units	Garrison
XIII (Royal Württemberg) Corps	26th Division	51st Infantry Brigade	119th (1st Württemberg) Grenadiers "Queen Olga"	Stuttgart
XIII (Royal Württemberg) Corps	26th Division	51st Infantry Brigade	125th (7th Württemberg) Infantry "Emperor Frederick, King of Prussia"	Stuttgart
XIII (Royal Württemberg) Corps	26th Division	52nd Infantry Brigade	121st (3rd Württemberg)(Old Württemberg) Infantry	Ludwigsburg
XIII (Royal Württemberg) Corps	26th Division	52nd Infantry Brigade	122nd (4th Württemberg) Fusiliers "Emperor Francis Joseph of Austria, King of Hungary"	Heilbronn, II Bn at Mergentheim
XIII (Royal Württemberg) Corps	26th Division	26th Field Artillery Brigade	29th (2nd Württemberg) Field Artillery "Prince Regent Luitpold of Bavaria"	Ludwigsburg
XIII (Royal Württemberg) Corps	26th Division	26th Field Artillery Brigade	65th (4th Württemberg) Field Artillery	Ludwigsburg
XIII (Royal Württemberg) Corps	26th Division	26th Cavalry Brigade	25th (1st Württemberg) Dragoons "Queen Olga"	Ludwigsburg
XIII (Royal Württemberg) Corps	26th Division	26th Cavalry Brigade	26th (2nd Württemberg) Dragoons "King"	Stuttgart-Cannstatt
XIII (Royal Württemberg) Corps	27th Division	53rd Infantry Brigade	123rd (5th Württemberg) Grenadiers "King Charles"	Ulm
XIII (Royal Württemberg) Corps	27th Division	53rd Infantry Brigade	124th (6th Württemberg) Infantry "King William I"	Weingarten
XIII (Royal Württemberg) Corps	27th Division	54th Infantry Brigade	120th (2nd Württemberg) Infantry "Emperor William, King of Prussia"	Ulm
XIII (Royal Württemberg) Corps	27th Division	54th Infantry Brigade	127th (9th Württemberg) Infantry	Ulm, Waiblingen
XIII (Royal Württemberg) Corps	27th Division	54th Infantry Brigade	180th (10th Württemberg) Infantry	Tübingen, II Bn at Schwäbisch Gmünd
XIII (Royal Württemberg) Corps	27th Division	27th Field Artillery Brigade	13th (1st Württemberg) Field Artillery "King Charles"	Ulm, Stuttgart-Cannstatt
XIII (Royal Württemberg) Corps	27th Division	27th Field Artillery Brigade	49th (3rd Württemberg) Field Artillery	Ulm
XIII (Royal Württemberg) Corps	27th Division	27th Cavalry Brigade	19th (1st Württemberg) Uhlans "King Charles"	Ulm, Wiblingen
XIII (Royal Württemberg) Corps	27th Division	27th Cavalry Brigade	20th (2nd Württemberg) Uhlans "King William I"	Ludwigsburg
XIII (Royal Württemberg) Corps	Corps Troops		13th (Württemberg) Pioneer Battalion	Ulm
XIII (Royal Württemberg) Corps	Corps Troops		13th (Württemberg) Train Battalion	Ludwigsburg
XIII (Royal Württemberg) Corps	Stuttgart Defence Command (Landwehr-Inspektion)			Stuttgart

In addition, the 126th (8th Württemberg) Infantry "Grand Duke Frederick of Baden" was stationed at Straßburg as part of XV Corps.

== World War I ==
=== Organisation on mobilisation ===
On mobilization on August 2, 1914 the Corps was restructured. The 180th Infantry Regiment was assigned to the 26th Reserve Division in XIV Reserve Corps. The 26th Cavalry Brigade was withdrawn to form part of the 7th Cavalry Division and the 27th Cavalry Brigade was broken up and its regiments assigned as reconnaissance units to the divisions. The two divisions received engineer companies and other support units from the Corps headquarters. In summary, XIII Corps mobilised with 24 infantry battalions, 8 machine gun companies (48 machine guns), 8 cavalry squadrons, 24 field artillery batteries (144 guns), 4 heavy artillery batteries (16 guns), 3 pioneer companies and an aviation detachment.

Initial wartime organization of the Corps
Corps	Division	Brigade	Units
XIII (Royal Württemberg) Corps	26th Division	51st Infantry Brigade	119th Grenadier Regiment
XIII (Royal Württemberg) Corps	26th Division	51st Infantry Brigade	125th Infantry Regiment
XIII (Royal Württemberg) Corps	26th Division	52nd Infantry Brigade	121st Infantry Regiment
XIII (Royal Württemberg) Corps	26th Division	52nd Infantry Brigade	122nd Fusilier Regiment
XIII (Royal Württemberg) Corps	26th Division	26th Field Artillery Brigade	29th Field Artillery Regiment
XIII (Royal Württemberg) Corps	26th Division	26th Field Artillery Brigade	65th Field Artillery Regiment
XIII (Royal Württemberg) Corps	26th Division		20th Uhlan Regiment
XIII (Royal Württemberg) Corps	26th Division		1st Company, 13th Pioneer Battalion
XIII (Royal Württemberg) Corps	26th Division		26th Divisional Pontoon Train
XIII (Royal Württemberg) Corps	26th Division		1st Medical Company
XIII (Royal Württemberg) Corps	26th Division		3rd Medical Company
XIII (Royal Württemberg) Corps	27th Division	53rd Infantry Brigade	123rd Grenadier Regiment
XIII (Royal Württemberg) Corps	27th Division	53rd Infantry Brigade	124th Infantry Regiment
XIII (Royal Württemberg) Corps	27th Division	54th Infantry Brigade	120th Infantry Regiment
XIII (Royal Württemberg) Corps	27th Division	54th Infantry Brigade	127th Infantry Regiment
XIII (Royal Württemberg) Corps	27th Division	27th Field Artillery Brigade	13th Field Artillery Regiment
XIII (Royal Württemberg) Corps	27th Division	27th Field Artillery Brigade	49th Field Artillery Regiment
XIII (Royal Württemberg) Corps	27th Division		19th Uhlan Regiment
XIII (Royal Württemberg) Corps	27th Division		2nd Company, 12th Pioneer Battalion
XIII (Royal Württemberg) Corps	27th Division		3rd Company, 12th Pioneer Battalion
XIII (Royal Württemberg) Corps	27th Division		27th Divisional Pontoon Train
XIII (Royal Württemberg) Corps	27th Division		2nd Medical Company
XIII (Royal Württemberg) Corps	Corps Troops		I Battalion, 13th Foot Artillery Regiment
XIII (Royal Württemberg) Corps	Corps Troops		4th Aviation Detachment
XIII (Royal Württemberg) Corps	Corps Troops		13th Corps Pontoon Train
XIII (Royal Württemberg) Corps	Corps Troops		13th Telephone Detachment
XIII (Royal Württemberg) Corps	Corps Troops		13th Pioneer Searchlight Section
XIII (Royal Württemberg) Corps	Corps Troops		Munition Trains and Columns corresponding to II Corps

=== Combat chronicle ===
On mobilization in 1914, the corps was subordinated to the 5th Army and saw action on the Western Front. It was transferred to the 6th Army during the Race to the Sea. In October 1914, the corps headquarters formed Corps Fabeck, which by the end of the month had become a provisional army group, commanding XV Corps, II Bavarian Corps and Corps Urach. In November, the XIII Army Corps was transferred from the 6th Army to the 9th Army on the Eastern Front. By 1916, the corps had returned to the Western Front and was subordinated to the 4th Army under Army Group Crown Prince Rupprecht. From April 1917 to March 1918, the corps commanded Group Caudry, another provisional command. In September 1918, it took over command of Group Ebene under Army Group Duke Albrecht of Württemberg, and commanded Group Ebene until war's end.

It was still in existence at the end of the war in Armee-Abteilung C, Heeresgruppe Gallwitz on the Western Front.

=== Württemberg mountain battalion ===
In 1915, drafts from the Württemberg line regiments were used to form a Württemberg mountain battalion, which became a part of the Alpenkorps division in 1917. This was the unit in which the young Erwin Rommel distinguished himself on the Romanian and Italian fronts, winning the Pour le Mérite (Imperial German equivalent of the Victoria Cross) at the Battle of the Isonzo in 1917.

== Commanders ==
The XIII Corps had the following commanders during its existence:

Dates	Rank	Name
up to 19 October 1871		Frederick Francis II, Grand Duke of Mecklenburg-Schwerin
19 October 1871	Generalleutnant	Wolf Louis Ferdinand von Stülpnagel
24 December 1873	General der Infanterie	Ferdinand Emil Karl von Schwartzkoppen
26 January 1878	General der Infanterie	Hans Ferdinand von Schachtmeyer
15 May 1886	General der Kavallerie	Gustav Hermann von Alvensleben
26 October 1890	Generalleutnant	Wilhelm von Woelckern
22 March 1895	General der Infanterie	Oskar von Lindequist
25 March 1899	Generalleutnant	Ludwig Freiherr von Falkenhausen
22 March 1902	General der Infanterie	Konrad von Hugo
4 April 1907	General der Infanterie	Joseph von Fallois
25 February 1908	General der Kavallerie	Albrecht, Duke of Württemberg
1 March 1913	General der Infanterie	Max von Fabeck
9 March 1915	General der Infanterie	Theodor Freiherr von Watter
17 March 1918	General der Infanterie	Hermann von Staabs
22 May 1918	General der Infanterie	Theodor Freiherr von Watter

== See also ==
- Army of Württemberg
- German Army order of battle (1914)
- German Army order of battle, Western Front (1918)
- History of Württemberg
- List of Imperial German infantry regiments
- List of Imperial German artillery regiments
- List of Imperial German cavalry regiments

== Bibliography ==
- Claus von Bredow, bearb., Historische Rang- und Stammliste des deutschen Heeres (1905)
- Rommel, E. Infanterie Greift An, Voggenreiter, Potsdam 1937
- Cron, Hermann (2002). Imperial German Army 1914-18: Organisation, Structure, Orders-of-Battle [first published: 1937]. Helion & Co. ISBN 1-874622-70-1.
- Ellis, John; Cox, Michael (1993). The World War I Databook. Aurum Press Ltd. ISBN 1-85410-766-6.
- Haythornthwaite, Philip J. (1996). The World War One Source Book. Arms and Armour. ISBN 1-85409-351-7.
- Wegner, Günter (1993). Stellenbesetzung der deustchen Heere 1815-1939. Vol. 1. Osnabrück: Biblio Verlag.
- Histories of Two Hundred and Fifty-One Divisions of the German Army which Participated in the War (1914-1918), compiled from records of Intelligence section of the General Staff, American Expeditionary Forces, at General Headquarters, Chaumont, France 1919. The London Stamp Exchange Ltd. 1989 [1920]. ISBN 0-948130-87-3.
- The German Forces in the Field; 7th Revision, 11th November 1918; Compiled by the General Staff, War Office. Imperial War Museum, London and the Battery Press. 1995 [1918]. ISBN 978-1-870423-95-3.
