= Bug–Narew offensive =

1915 German offensive on the Eastern Front of World War I

- Part of the Great Retreat (Russia) of Eastern Front of World War I
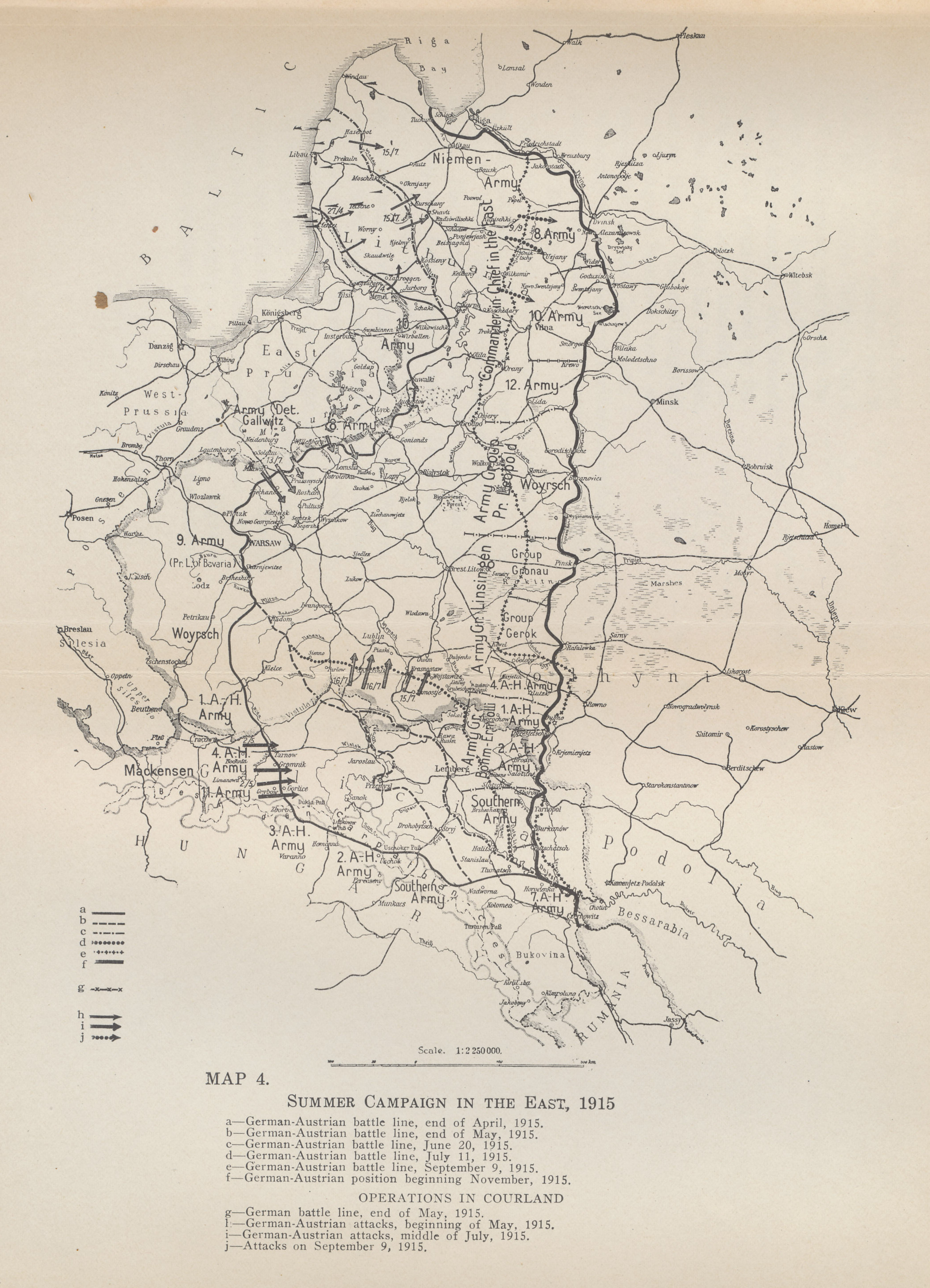
- German summer offensive in the Eastern Front 1915
| Date | 13 July – 27 August 1915 |
| Location | Bug and Narew area, (present-day Poland) |
| Result | German victory |

Belligerents
| German Empire | Russian Empire |

Commanders and leaders
| (German Empire) Paul von Hindenburg (German Empire) Erich Ludendorff (German Empire) Max Hoffmann (German Empire) Max von Gallwitz (German Empire) Friedrich von Scholtz | Mikhail Alekseyev; Alexander Litvinov; Vladimir Gorbatovsky |

Units involved
| (German Empire) Armee-Gruppe Gallwitz (German Empire) 8th Army (German Empire) 9th Army | 1st Army; 12th Army; 2nd Army |

Strength
| On 13 July 1915; 536,006 men | On 13 July 1915; 763,118 men |

Casualties and losses
| Total 104,398 men 24,726 KIA; 75,181 WIA; 4,491 MIA | Total 435,656 men: 37,987 KIA; 163,606 WIA; 233,619 MIA |

The Bug–Narew offensive from July 13 to August 27, 1915 was a major German victory during World War I on the Eastern Front. The Imperial German Army broke through 4 heavily fortified positions, inflicted defeats on superior enemy forces and pushed the Russian Army 300 km to the east, capturing 215,000 prisoners. But the German army also suffered relatively heavy casualties, about 30,000 killed and missing.

== Background ==
The victories won by the armies of the Central Powers in the Gorlice–Tarnów offensive by the end of May 1915 prompted consideration of the development of success along the entire Eastern Front. On May 28, the Chief of German Great General Staff, General of Infantry Erich von Falkenhayn, defined the tasks of the German army of the Eastern Front in continuing the offensive: as holding Libava for the longest possible time, capturing Warsaw with the help of chemical weapons, and facilitating the operation in Galicia by attracting Russian forces. At the same time, the front on the Narew was no longer given much importance. The chief of staff of the Supreme Commander of All German Forces in the East, Lieutenant-General Erich Ludendorff, agreed only to conduct a new offensive on the Pilica River, transferring 4 divisions from Narew River to this sector. The Supreme Commander of All German Forces in the East, Field Marshal Paul von Hindenburg, was against any weakening along the entire German Eastern front. On June 2, Falkenhayn reported that the resistance of the Russian troops in Galicia had weakened, and there was no longer a need for a strike on Pilica river.

The question of the transition of the German Eastern Front to active operations was again discussed at the highest level on June 3–4 and 11. Falkenhayn this time put forward the idea of an offensive north of the Neman, using forces from the 9th Army, whose front near Warsaw was quite reliable. On June 20, Hindenburg agreed to a plan to resume the offensive against Mitava and Kovno, using reserves from the 8th Army and the army group of Max von Gallwitz, but subject to the simultaneous offensive of August von Mackensen's army group from the Vistula to the Bug and fleet operations against Riga.

On June 28, two proposals were received at the Hindenburg headquarters in Lötzen: this time Falkenhayn conveyed the wish of Emperor Wilhelm II that the attack against Kovno serve as a cover for crossing the Vistula at the mouth of the Pilica, and Gallwitz proposed to strike at Przasnysz and Ciechanów. Hindenburg rejected both the Gallwitz plan, as directed against the heavily fortified part of the Russian front and Novogeorgievsk, and the idea of breaking through the 9th Army through several Russian defense lines. He, together with E. Ludendorff, proposed either to further strengthen the Mackensen's Army Group and refrain from attacking the armies of the Eastern Front, or to strike at the front of Kovno, Grodno.

On June 30, Falkenhayn and the chiefs of staff of the armies of the Eastern Front arrived in Lötzen to discuss this project. Ludendorff now insisted on an offensive along the Neman River against Kovno, he was supported by Falkenhayn, who demanded to speed up the preparation of the operation. The chief of staff of the German 8th Army, Colonel D. von Schwerin, who proved the unprofitability of the attack on Osowiec Fortress and offered to shift the blow to Łomża and to the west, was not listened to. Also, Lieutenant Colonel G. Markvard, Chief of Staff of the Army Group Gallwitz, did not receive an answer about the plan to attack Przasnysz.

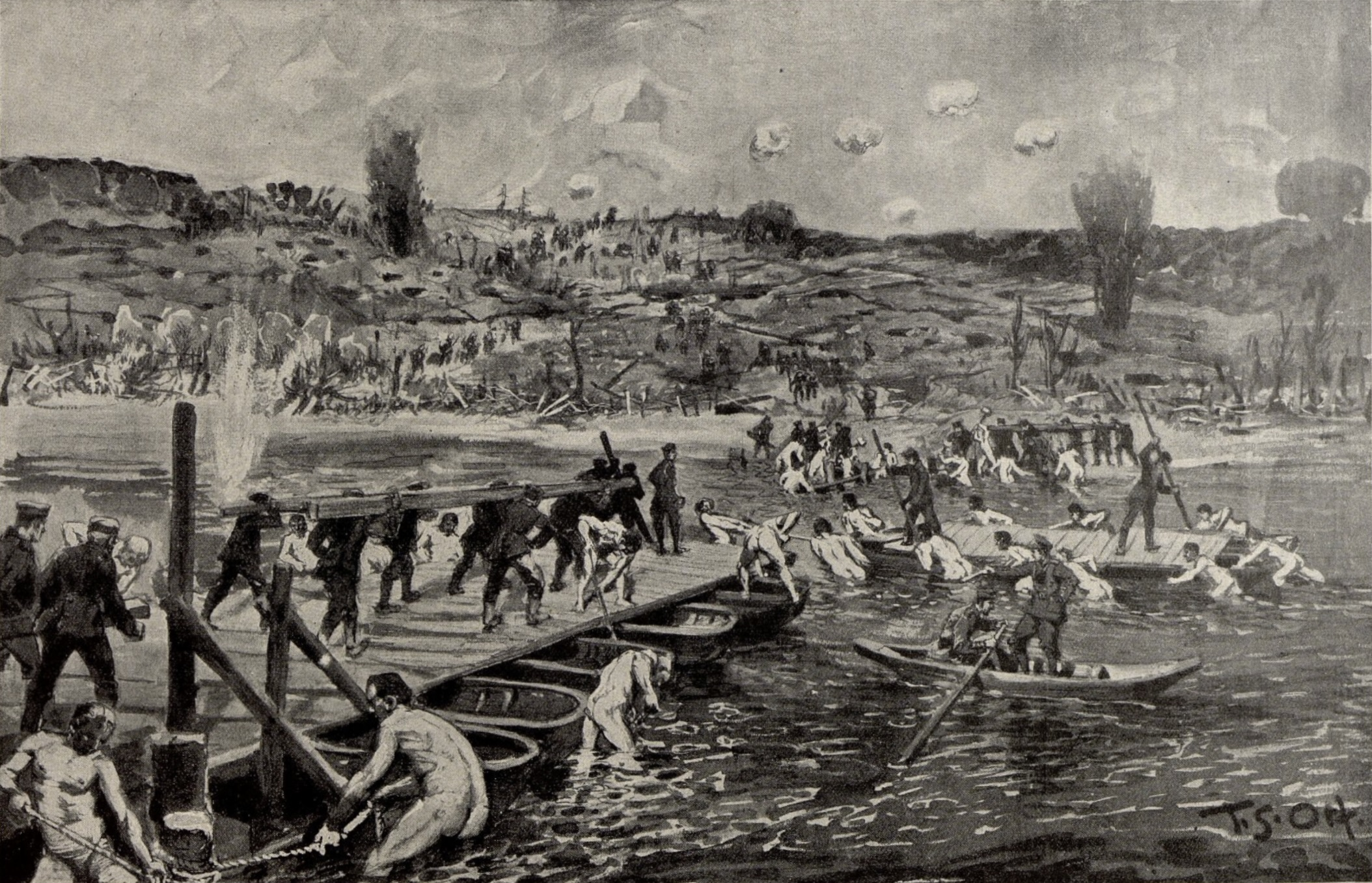
German pioneers build bridges over the Narew river (German illustration)

However, Falkenhayn, after visiting Mackensen in Rava-Ruska and Archduke Friedrich in Pless, on July 2 conferred with Wilhelm II in Posen. The result was a directive dated 2 July (Signed by the Kaiser on July 3, but sent to headquarters the day before): “In addition to the great success in Galicia and the temporary improvement in the situation of Mackensen's troops. it is necessary to continue the offensive against Russia, limited in time and space of targets, so that the Supreme High Command at any time, in case of need, can quickly transfer large forces to another front. It is necessary to complete the operation in the East in 2 months. For this, a great military victory is needed through the close interaction of the Mackensen and Hindenburg army groups between the Bug, the Vistula and the Narew.

The decision was influenced by the position of the chief of staff of the Austro-Hungarian Army Higher Command, Infantry General Franz Conrad von Hötzendorf. On June 28, he shared with Falkenhayn the idea to surround the Russian armies west of the Bug with a strike on Siedlce from the north and a broad offensive from the Vistula to the Bug from the south - along a 650-km arc. On July 1, the "Directives for the development of operations" were discussed by the commander-in-chief, Archduke Friedrich, Duke of Teschen, with Falkenhayn, and on July 2 - with Emperor Wilhelm II and received his approval.

On July 3, Supreme Commander of All German Forces in the East, Hindenburg ordered: the army of Remus von Woyrsch - to cover the operations of the Army Group Mackensen from Ivangorod and the mouth of the Pilica (river) and pursue the Russians in case of their retreat; 9th Army - to defend the left bank of the Vistula and advance along with the Woyrsch army through Warsaw and Novogeorgievsk if the Russians retreat; the army group of M. von Gallwitz to deliver the main blow to the Russian 1st Army and, after the breakthrough, go to Novogeorgievsk and the mouth of the Szkwa River, bearing in mind the exit to Siedlce; 8th Army - to assist the offensive of the Gallwitz group and join it; 10th Army - to cover the sector from Raygrod to the Neman River west of Kovno; Army of the Niemen - attack the Russian 5th Army to facilitate the task of the 10th Army. Gallwitz was informed the day before by Ludendorff and the Quartermaster General of Supreme Commander of All German Forces in the East, Lieutenant Colonel M. Hoffman, about the adoption of his project, about the intended goal of the offensive (offensive to Siedlce, that is, a breakthrough to a depth of 140 km, was replaced by a transition Narew from Pultusk to Różan and Ostrolenka).

== Comparison of strength ==
By July 5, the development of the "Haymaking" operation was completed at the Gallwitz's headquarters. The main blow to the west of Przasnysz was delivered by the XVII Reserve, XI and XVII Corps, to the east of Przasnysz the XIII and I Corps advanced. Artillery support was provided by 71 batteries of field guns, 39 batteries of light howitzers, 38 batteries of heavy howitzers, 6 batteries of 21 cm mortars, 5 batteries of 10 cm heavy guns, a battery of 15 cm naval guns (822 guns in total) and 56 mortars. There were 281,784 men. The German 8th Army, which contributed to the offensive on the Narew River(commanded by artillery general Friedrich von Scholtz), had 110,500 men in service and occupied positions from the Orzyc River to the Bobr River; it was less abundantly supplied with heavy artillery and shells.

Russian fortified positions consisted of four defensive lines, resting against the fortresses of Novogeorgievsk, Pultusk, Różan, Ostrolenka, Łomża, and Osowiec. The 1st Army of Cavalry General A. Litvinov defended the front from the banks of the Vistula River northeast of the mouth of the Narew to the Omulew Rivers. From the Omulew River to the Bobr River, the 12th Army of Infantry General A. Churin defended. In the 1st Army there were 378,095 men, in the 12th Army - 212,082 men. The defense of this sector of the front had to be reliable: the Russian troops had a significant superiority in manpower, both armies had 767 machine guns and 2,328 guns, but more than half of the artillery was in the fortresses of Novogeorgievsk (1,164) and Osowiec (96).

The defense of the Vistula from the Narew River to the mouth of the Pilica River, including Warsaw, was entrusted to the 2nd Army of Infantry General V. Smirnov, numbering 172,941 men with 187 machine guns and 322 guns. There were 3,222 men and 66 guns in the Warsaw Alexander Citadel. Opposing these forces, the German 9th Army, Field Marshal Prince Leopold of Bavaria, gradually turned into a source of replenishment for strike groups. 143,722 men remained in it.

== Fourth phase: general retreat of the Russian armies ==
Russian troops retained a numerical advantage over the Germans, the supply of shells made it possible to conduct an intense battle for several days. However, the German and Austro-Hungarian troops of the army of Remus von Woyrsch managed to force the Vistula River above Ivangorod and create a threat to the rear of the Ivangorod fortress and the Russian 2nd Army. On August 2, M. Alekseyev gave the order to stubbornly defend the line of Warsaw forts and Praga (a suburb of Warsaw on the right bank of the Vistula River), but in the evening he ordered to withdraw the 2nd Army on the night of August 3 to the right bank of the Vistula, retaining only the line of forts, but not waging a stubborn battle on it, but only, if possible, delaying the Germans. As a result, both the 1st and 12th Russian armies had to take measures for the timely withdrawal of units so as not to be cut off by the breakthrough of the armies of the Central Powers from the south. The garrison of the Novogeorgievsk fortress, now subordinate directly to M. Alekseyev; on August 3, it began to be withdrawn from advanced positions to the forts of the outer bypass. Covering the withdrawal of the 2nd, 4th and 3rd armies was assigned to the 1st and 12th armies.

In the Russian 12th Army on August 3, a stubborn battle continued along the entire front, while the 4th Siberian Army Corps was again thrown back. German troops captured 2,000 prisoners and 14 machine guns.

On August 4, after 14:00, the Germans attacked with large forces and broke through the positions of the 1st Siberian Army Corps and threw back the left flank of the 1st Siberian Army Corps of the 12th Army. The losses suffered were so great that at midnight on August 5, the commander of the 1st Army ordered the right flank of the army to be withdrawn with the withdrawal of the IV Corps to the army reserve. During the day the German onslaught continued. Actions in the sector of the 12th Army were also fierce. On August 4-5, Russian troops stubbornly defended their positions along the Orzyc river, constantly conducting counterattacks, but by the evening they were pushed back. On the night of August 5, Russian troops of the 2nd Army left Warsaw, blowing up railway stations and bridges across the Vistula River. In the morning, the troops of the German 9th Army, led by Field Marshal Prince Leopold of Bavaria, entered the capital of the Kingdom of Poland.

On August 6, the army group of M. von Gallwitz was transformed into the 12th Army. To strengthen the offensive on the left flank of the army, the XI Corps was transferred. In three days, Russian troops were driven back at a front of 25 km to 4-7 km to the east, they lost 85 officers and 14,200 soldiers as prisoners, 6 guns, 8 mortars, 69 machine guns.

On August 7, the 12th Army's 1st Army Corps was again attacked and left the northern part of Szczepankowo. Following the 12th Army, under pressure from the German's (XIII and XVII Corps), the right flank of the 1st Army began to retreat. By the morning of August 8, the 1st Army also made a withdrawal. As a result of the retreat of the 1st and 2nd Armies, the Novogeorgievsk fortress was blocked from the south by the division of Lieutenant General Thilo von Westernhagen from the German 9th Army. Ludendorff sent von Galwitz an order for a “parallel pursuit” of Russian troops along the Bug River in order to intercept their retreat to the east. The capture of Novogeorgievsk was entrusted to the siege corps of Hans Hartwig von Beseler, while Ludendorff insisted on attacking the fortress from the east, from the confluence of the Bug and Vistula, while Gallwitz considered it more convenient to attack from the north, where there were no water barriers.

Having discovered the withdrawal of Russian troops, the German 12th Army, on the morning of August 8, turned to pursuit. Pressure continued on the left flank of the Russian 12th Army. The heavy casualties of the Russian 12th Army (up to 80,000 men, of which 30,000 were killed and captured) forced its commander to decide to withdraw, despite the objections the chief of the staff of the North-Western Front. The 33rd and 78th Divisions were completely destroyed, only 380 men remained in the brigade of the 44th Division. The situation with ammunition became more complicated: 140 shells remained for a light gun, 101 - for a corps mortar, 56 - for a heavy howitzer, and 86 - for a heavy gun. Only 4,100 shells for field and 652 for heavy guns remained in the 12th Army.

The situation was complicated by the offensive of the German 9th Army, which crossed from Warsaw to the right bank of the Vistula River. By the evening of August 10, the Russian 1st and 12th armies retreated to new positions, the Germans completely captured the Łomża fortress, and entrenched themselves on the banks of the Bug River. But the onslaught on the junction of the Russian armies continued. On the night of August 11, the 12th Army retreated from the bend of the Narew River. Von Gallwitz was preparing to continue pushing through the junction of the Russian armies, but E. Ludendorff categorically ordered the direction of the attack to be shifted to the right flank - along the right bank of the Bug River. On August 11, the German XVII and XIII Corps pushed back parts of the 1st Siberian and 21st Army Corps beyond Zuzel and towards Czyżew. The XI and I Corps again defeated the 4th Siberian and 5th Army Corps. The German 8th and 12th Armies received a new task: to advance on Bielsk Podlaski.

On August 12, the German 8th Army attacked the positions of the 1st Army Corps of the Russian 12th Army, the German 75th Reserve Division advanced 20 km at once. The 4th Siberian Army Corps, reinforced by the new 61st Division, offered stubborn resistance to the German I Corps, but the left flank of the corps was pushed back 7 km. The position of the Russian armies was threatening, on the night of August 13, the Russian armies continued to withdraw, but he was quickly discovered by the enemy. Already at 3 o'clock the Germans began the pursuit, introducing the 86th Infantry Division into battle again. The Germans advanced 18-20 km to the east until evening, and the I Corps - up to 25 km. The 1st and 2nd Armies retreated towards Brest-Litovsk. In the Russian 1st Army, the 21st Army Corps could not withstand the German onslaught and retreated across the Narev River, followed by the 27th, 4th, 1st Siberian and 1st Cavalry Corps. Not hoping to stay on randomly busy lines. A. Litvinov ordered the army to withdraw on the night of August 15. On August 15, the corps of the center and left wing of the army of M. von Gallwitz reached the Myanka River, repelling Russian counterattacks and capturing 2,900 prisoners.

On August 16, the Germans discovered the withdrawal of the Russian 12th and 1st Armies to Białystok. Aerial reconnaissance showed that the outskirts of the city were fortifying, heavy artillery was delivered there. By evening, the troops of M. von Gallwitz reached the Narew River along the entire course. On August 17, the Russian 2nd, 1st and 12th Armies went on the offensive to push the Germans back from Białystok and Velsk. The strongest attacks were directed at the junction of the German 9th and 12th armies. The 2nd Austro-Hungarian Cavalry Division was driven back. In the sectors of other corps of the 12th and 8th Armies, the Russian offensive did not bring success, but the Germans was pressed to his trenches. From the decoded radiograms, the staff of Gallwitz received information that the Russian troops were occupying defensive positions. Gallwitz believed that on the line between the Narew and the Bug, the Russian armies would create a strong defense for long-term resistance. He admitted that the attempt to envelop the Russian armies failed due to insufficient pressure on the near flanks.

On August 18, the Russian 1st, 2nd and 12th Armies withdrew to new positions, leaving strong rearguards against the junction of the 12th and 8th armies of the enemy until noon. The pursuit began at noon, the German troops marched more than 13 km. By the end of August 21, the troops of M. von Gallwitz reached the line east of Brest-Litovsk. Troops of the 9th Army took Kleszczele. The quartermaster general of the staff of the army group P. von Hindenburg, Lieutenant Colonel M. Hoffman, announced a new task set by the Supreme Commander of All German Forces in the East: to reach the Riga-Grodno-Brest line. On August 23-25, in stubborn battles with the Russian rearguards of the 1st, 2nd and 4th Armies, the German troops advanced in the bend of the Narew and approached Białowieża Forest from the west. On the night of August 26, the Russian troops retreated again, pursuing them, the German divisions occupied Białystok (37th division of the 8th Army). On the same day, the Germans occupied Brest-Litovsk, set on fire during the retreat.

With the fall of Brest-Litovsk and Białystok, the Bug-Narew offensive came to an end.

== Outcome ==
The staff of the Supreme Commander of All German Forces in the East stated the failure of attempts to encircle the Russian armies in front of the middle course of the Bug River. The Russian armies of the center of the Northwestern Front withdrew beyond the Bug and Narew Rivers without losing contact with each other and not allowing a deep breakthrough of the German troops. At the same time, the German Imperial army was able to inflict huge losses on the Russian Empire in manpower (the ratio of killed and missing was 1 to 9 in favor of German Empire). The overexpenditure of a modest supply of shells began to affect the effectiveness of the Russian defense: by August, Russian troops had lost the ability to wage protracted battles. The result was the fall or abandonment of the belt of western fortresses, including the two most powerful - Kovno and Novogeorgievsk. This result was largely a consequence of the fighting on the left flank of the armies of the North-Western Front between the Vistula and the Bug, where the army group of August von Mackensen was advancing.
