= List of divisions of the Imperial German Army =

The following is a list of divisions of the Imperial German Army.

== Background ==
The basic tactical formation was the division. A standard Imperial German division was organised into:

- Division HQ
- Two infantry brigades organised into a brigade HQ and two regiments each (either of the line or light infantry),
- A cavalry brigade organised into a brigade HQ and two regiments
- An artillery brigade organised into an HQ and two regiments
- Combat service and support regiments under division HQ

One of the divisions in a corps area usually also managed the corps Landwehr region (Landwehrbezirk). In 1914, besides the Guard Corps (two Guard divisions and a Guard cavalry division), there were 42 regular divisions in the Prussian Army (including four Saxon divisions and two Württemberg divisions), and six divisions in the Bavarian Army.

These divisions were all mobilised in August 1914. They were reorganised, receiving engineer companies and other support units from their corps, and giving up most of their cavalry to form cavalry divisions. Reserve divisions were also formed, Landwehr brigades were aggregated into divisions, and other divisions were formed from replacement (Ersatz) units. As World War I progressed, additional divisions were formed, and by wars' end, 251 divisions had been formed or reformed in the German Army's structure.

== Standing armies ==
=== Guards ===
- 1st Guards Infantry
- 2nd Guards Infantry
- Cavalry

=== Regular ===
- 1st
- 2nd
- 3rd
- 4th
- 5th
- 6th
- 7th
- 8th
- 9th
- 10th
- 11th
- 12th
- 13th
- 14th
- 15th
- 16th
- 17th
- 18th
- 19th
- 20th
- 21st
- 22nd
- 23rd
- 24th
- 25th
- 26th
- 27th
- 28th
- 29th
- 30th
- 31st
- 32nd
- 33rd
- 34th
- 35th
- 36th
- 37th
- 38th
- 39th
- 40th
- 41st
- 42nd

=== Bavarian ===
- 1st
- 2nd
- 3rd
- 4th
- 5th
- 6th

== Raised in World War I ==
=== Guards ===
- 3rd Guards Infantry
- 4th Guards Infantry
- 5th Guards Infantry
- 1st Guards Reserve
- 2nd Guards Reserve
- Guards Ersatz

=== Cavalry ===
- 1st
- 2nd
- 3rd
- 4th
- 5th
- 6th
- 7th
- 8th
- 9th
- Bavarian

=== Infantry ===
- 50th
- 52nd
- 54th
- 56th
- 58th
- 83rd
- 84th
- 86th
- 87th
- 88th
- 89th
- 91st
- 92nd
- 93rd
- 94th
- 95th
- 96th
- 101st
- 103rd
- 105th
- 107th
- 108th
- 109th
- 111th
- 113th
- 115th
- 117th
- 119th
- 121st
- 123rd
- 183rd
- 185th
- 187th
- 192nd
- 195th
- 197th
- 199th
- 200th
- 201st
- 202nd
- 203rd
- 204th
- 205th
- 206th
- 207th
- 208th
- 211th
- 212th
- 213th
- 214th
- 215th
- 216th
- 217th
- 218th
- 219th
- 220th
- 221st
- 222nd
- 223rd
- 224th
- 225th
- 226th
- 227th
- 228th
- 231st
- 232nd
- 233rd
- 234th
- 235th
- 236th
- 237th
- 238th
- 239th
- 240th
- 241st
- 242nd
- 243rd
- 255th
- 301st
- 302nd
- 303rd

=== Reserve ===
- 1st
- 3rd
- 5th
- 6th
- 7th
- 9th
- 10th
- 11th
- 12th
- 13th
- 14th
- 15th
- 16th
- 17th
- 18th
- 19th
- 21st
- 22nd
- 23rd
- 24th
- 25th
- 26th
- 28th
- 30th (Bavarian)
- 33rd
- 35th
- 36th
- 39th (Bavarian)
- 43rd
- 44th
- 45th
- 46th
- 47th
- 48th
- 49th
- 50th
- 51st
- 52nd
- 53rd
- 54th
- 75th
- 76th
- 77th
- 78th
- 79th
- 80th
- 81st
- 82nd

=== Landwehr ===
- 1st
- 2nd
- 3rd
- 4th
- 5th
- 6th (Bavarian)
- 7th
- 8th
- 9th
- 10th
- 11th
- 12th
- 13th
- 14th
- 15th
- 16th
- 17th
- 18th
- 19th
- 20th
- 21st
- 22nd
- 23rd
- 25th
- 26th
- 38th
- 44th
- 45th
- 46th
- 47th
- 48th
- 85th

=== Ersatz Of the German Imperial Army ===
- 4th
- 5th
- 8th
- 10th
- 19th

=== Naval ===
- Naval
- 1st
- 2nd
- 3rd

=== Bavarian infantry ===
- 10th
- 11th
- 12th
- 14th
- 15th
- 16th

=== Bavarian reserve ===
- 1st
- 5th
- 6th
- 8th
- 9th
- 30th
- 39th

=== Bavarian Landwehr and Ersatz ===
- 1st
- 2nd
- 6th
- Ersatz

=== Other ===
- Alpenkorps
- Deutsche Jäger
- Ostsee (Baltic Sea)
  - Detachment Brandenstein

== See also ==
- Imperial German Army
- List of corps of the Imperial German Army
- World War I
