= List of corps of the Imperial German Army =

The following is a list of corps of the Imperial German Army

== Background ==
The basic organisational formation was the army corps (Armeekorps). The corps consisted of two or more divisions and various support troops, covering a geographical area. The corps was also responsible for maintaining the reserves and Landwehr in the corps area. By 1914, there were 21 corps areas under Prussian jurisdiction and three Bavarian army corps. Besides the regional corps, there was also a Guard Corps (Gardecorps), which controlled the elite Prussian Guard units. A corps usually included a light infantry (Jäger) battalion, a heavy artillery (Fußartillerie) battalion, an engineer battalion, a telegraph battalion, and a trains battalion. Some corps areas also disposed of fortress troops; each of the 25 corps had a Field Aviation Unit (Feldflieger Abteilung) attached to it normally equipped with six unarmed "A" or "B" class unarmed two-seat observation aircraft apiece.

In wartime, the army corps became a mobile tactical formation and four Höhere Kavallerie-Kommando (Higher Cavalry Commands) were formed from the Cavalry Inspectorate, the equivalent of corps, being made up of two divisions of cavalry.

The areas formerly covered by the corps each became the responsibility of a Wehrkreis (military district, sometimes translated as corps area). The military districts were to supervise the training and enlistment of reservists and new recruits. Originally each military district was linked to an army corps; thus Wehrkreis I took over the area that I. Armeekorps had been responsible for and sent replacements to the same formation. The first sixteen reserve corps raised followed the same pattern; X. Reserve-Korps was made up of reservists from the same area as X. Armeekorps. However, these links between rear areas and front line units were broken as the war went on and later corps were raised with troops from all over Germany.

== Regular ==
- Guards
- I
- II
- III
- IV
- V
- VI
- VII
- VIII
- IX
- X
- XI
- XII (1st Royal Saxon)
- XIII (Royal Württemberg)
- XIV (Grand Ducal Baden)
- XV
- XVI
- XVII
- XVIII
- XIX (2nd Royal Saxon)
- XX
- XXI

== Reserve ==
- Guards
- I
- III
- IV
- V
- VI
- VII
- VIII
- IX
- X
- XII
- XIV
- XV
- XVII
- XVIII
- XXII
- XXIII
- XXIV
- XXV
- XXVI
- XXVII
- XXXVIII
- XXXIX
- XXXX
- XXXXI

== Bavarian ==
- I
- II
- III
- I Reserve
- II Reserve
- XV Reserve

== Cavalry ==
- I
- II
- III
- IV
- V
- VI
- Schmettow

== General Commands for Special Use ==
- 51st
- 52nd
- 53rd
- 54th
- 55th
- 56th
- 57th
- 58th
- 59th
- 60th
- 61st
- 62nd
- 63rd
- 64th
- 65th
- 66th
- 67th
- 68th

== Other ==
- Landwehr
- Ersatz
- Naval

== See also ==
- Imperial German Army
- List of divisions of the Imperial German Army
- World War I
