= Heinrich Reiser =

German Gestapo officer

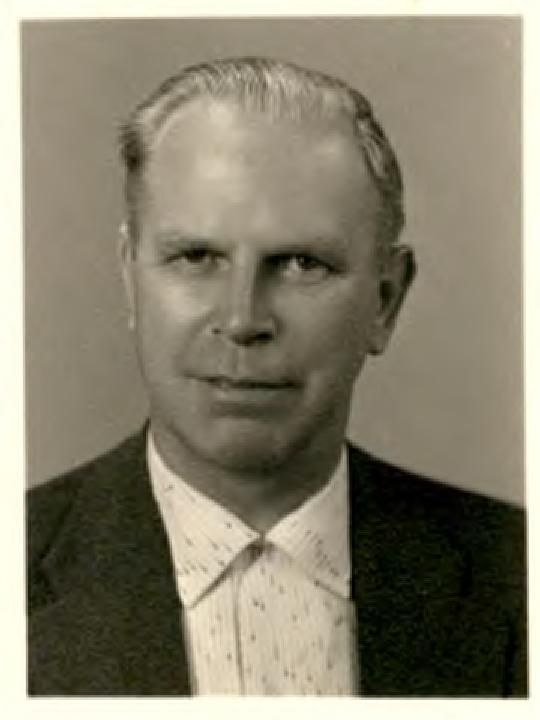
- Reiser taken in 2 August 1955
- Born: 17 October 1899
- Died: after 1963
- Military career
- Allegiance: Nazi party
- Branch: Gestapo

Heinrich Josef Reiser (17 October 1899 in Ehingen; after 1963) was a German Nazi war criminal, SS officer as well as a member of the Gestapo and the SD. Reiser fought in World War I and was captured. After he was released, he became an electrician and worked in several countries including Brazil. When he returned to Germany in 1931, he became part of the rise of Nazism, his real career, first becoming an SS officer in 1932 and then a Gestapo officer where he worked to round up Jews and communists in Karlsruhe area in the late interwar period and then later in the Czech Republic after the war started. In 1940, he was sent to Paris to work in the Sonderkommando Rote Kapelle. In 1943, Reiser was in line to become the commanding officer of the Sonderkommando Rote Kapelle as a replacement for Karl Giering. He briefly held the position when Giering fell ill but was later transferred back to the Karlsruhe Gestapo towards the end of World War II where he was involved in the repression of forced foreign labourers. From 1950 onward, he was an intelligence officer of the Gehlen Organization and the resulting Federal Intelligence Service. He became a major proponent for the continued existence of anti-Nazi resistance organisations in West Germany after the war, including Red Orchestra ("Rote Kapelle") and Schwarze Kapelle ("Black Orchestra"). This was an attempt to correct the perceived misperceptions of the Gestapo as a criminal organisation by identifying and purging former opponents of the Nazi regime from German public life and public opinion, in operations that were fully supported by the Gehlen organisation.

== Life ==
Reiser was the son of a bricklayer. As a child, he was raised a Catholic and initially attended the local elementary school. Since the family lived under financially limited conditions, Reiser, who was considered gifted, was sent in May 1913 for further education to an Italian branch of the men's order of the Fratelli delle Scuole Cristiane in Favria near Turin. While there, in addition to Italian, he learned French and English languages. After Italy entered World War I on the side of the Entente, however, Reiser was expelled from the country as an undesirable foreigner.

In Germany, he was subject to the Vaterländischer Hilfsdienst law that forced men between ages to 16 and 60 who had not been drafted, to work in the arms industry. The law was to ensure these men could be monitored within the industries they worked in to ensure they weren't fomenting any political upheaval. In May 1917, he was conscripted into the Imperial German Army and assigned to the 26th Dragoon and 19th Uhlan regiments. He was captured and taken as a prisoner of war to England and was released in 1919 due to injuries. He was in a military hospital until October 1920.

From January 1921, he established a position as a technical correspondent in Stuttgart. During the interwar period Reiser attended commercial school in Stuttgart, where he learned an electrical trade. Afterwards he lived and worked as a technician as well as a merchant abroad for several years, initially working in Austria, Yugoslavia and Hungary before moving to Brazil in 1927 to work as a self-employed electrical engineer. In 1931, he became unemployed as a result of the Great Depression in Latin America and returned to Germany penniless. While in Brazil, he learned to speak both Portuguese and Spanish. His attempt to become self-employed in Germany failed, and Reiser was only able to interrupt his unemployment occasionally with temporary jobs.

== Career ==
In September 1931, Reiser was inducted as a member of the SS (SS No. 21,844) and on 1 February 1932, of the Nazi Party (membership number 887,100). He resigned from the church. On 20 September 1933, as an unemployed SS man, he was assigned to the Land Office of the Political Police (Württembergisches Politisches Landespolizeiamt), later the Gestapo, in Stuttgart as an auxiliary police officer. This was the beginning of Reiser's "real career," according to historian Michael Stolle, since "he had understood in time to back the right horse in crisis-ridden Germany."

According to the social historian Christoph Rass, Reiser was active in the following years "in important positions of the Nazi power apparatus" despite his relatively low SS rank. In July 1935, as SS-Untersturmführer, he became deputy head of the Württemberg office of the Security Service of the Reichsführer SS. On the 13 September 1936 he was promoted to SS-Obersturmführer. He was subsequently transferred to Gestapo's headquarters in Karlsruhe. In 1936 Reiser was married and it was the expectation that all SS officers should have four children but the marriage remained childless. This combined with the fact that his education was lacking, severely limited his career prospects. To compensate, he decided to leave the Catholic church, denying the religious education he received as a child and adopted the Nazi ideology of belief in Gottgläubig, espousing a belief in god but not following any particular church. At the same time to increase his career prospects, he took an educational course for police in Berlin between 4 May 1938 to 1 February 1939. After the course he was promoted on 1 March 1939 to Kriminalkommissar. From March to September 1939, Reiser was then deputy head of the Jewish Department of the Gestapo in Karlsruhe. In 1939, Reiser was seconded to the Einsatzkommando "Stossberg" in Tábor, Czech Republic, in charge of the Gestapo field office there, holding the position until October 1940, as part of Operation Southeast Croatia. His responsibilities were the arrest of German emigrants, Czech anti-fascists, communists and those who were identified on the A-Kartei. Reiser was involved in the anti-German uprising in Tábor in mid-October 1939 that was brutally suppressed by the Gestapo and the SD.

In June 1940, Reiser was then transferred to occupied Paris, where he headed the "Abwehr-Kommunismus-Marxismus" (Defense Communism-Marxism) unit at the commander of the Security Police and SD as SS-Hauptsturmführer until 1942, under command of Helmut Knochen. Reiser responsibility was monitoring and destroy the activities of the French Communist Party. He also acted as a translator for the Sonderkommando. During this period, Reister was involved in the search for Franz Dahlem who was part of the German communist emigre groups who had fled Germany into France protection.

In the late summer of 1942, Reiser was ordered back to the Germany for assignment at the Gestapo HQ in Karlsruhe. However, he was only there for several weeks before being assigned in November 1942, to the Sonderkommando Rote Kapelle office in Paris, under command of SS Hauptsturmführer and Criminal Councillor Karl Giering in the investigation into the Red Orchestra espionage group.

== Rote Kapelle ==
By the start of the war, Reiser had become a specialist in left-wing resistance organisations, for example the Communist Party of Germany (KPD). When he joined the Sonderkommando, he became Karl Giering's deputy. In June 1943, Reiser took command and management of the unit due to Giering being ill with throat cancer. In August 1943 he was turn replaced by Heinz Pannwitz who came from Berlin headquarters. Reiser was also directly involved in day-to-day operations of the unit. For example, he was part of the operations to arrest Hillel Katz who worked as a recruiter and personal assistant to Leopold Trepper and Henry Robinson, the leader of a Soviet espionage group in Europe that ran from 1937 to 1941. Reiser was promoted to SS-Hauptsturmführer by Heinrich Himmler personally for his work in the arrest of Robinson.

In September 1943, Reiser was ordered back to the Karlsruhe Gestapo station, where he was put in command of the counterintelligence unit due to a shortage of senior officials. As part of his remit he became the director of department IIE which administered the affairs of foreign workers in the region. In 1944, the counterintelligence unit was downgraded to a single desk, indicating its reduced function as the war was reaching it final stages, while department IIE was strengthened due to Nazi worries about an uprising by foreign forced labour, which in turn due to the approaching front, saw an increase in Nazi brutality towards forced labourers and the breakdown of legal norms. Reiser was ordered into the use of Sonderbehandlung, a euphemism for mass murder by Nazi functionaries and the SS of enemies of the Nazis and admitted after the war that he was involved in the killing of up to dozen people, although an enquiry after the war found the figure could be as high as ten times as much. Many were subject to “the most brutal torture” and others to “special treatment”, i.e. the murder of forced laborers.

In the summer of 1944, a group of Soviet prisoners of war escaped in the Karlsruhe region and formed a resistance organisation. Reiser formed a Sonderkommando Reiser to investigate and pursue the group. The unit was based in Ettlingen Prison, where it investigated hundreds of people, many of whom were sent to concentration camps. From September 1944, Reiser's health began to deteriorate in a condition that lasted until the end of the year, and he was removed from the service.

In January 1945, he was conscripted into the Wehrmacht and served in the 257th Infantry Division, in an operation to attack the advancing Allied front around Füssen. He was taken prisoner and released in the same year. He initially hid in Freiberg as the war came to its end. He was discovered and arrested in November 1947 and sent to an internment camp. In the autumn of 1948, Reiser was taken to France for interrogation and imprisoned at the Cherche-Midi prison. He was released on the 2 July 1949. Reiser was never brought to trial, although there was ample evidence for war crimes. There is speculation that this was due to him testifying against the Rote Kapelle and providing reports that he submitted to the French military intelligence agency Deuxième Bureau. Supposedly in 1948, while in French custody, Reiser had spread the rumours that the Red Orchestra was only "seemingly dead" and could be reactivated by the Soviet Union at any time. The British secret service and the American Counterintelligence Corps (CIC) then tried in vain to recruit Reiser as a "specialist".

After his release on the 2 July 1949, an investigation was initiated by the Karlsruhe public prosecutor's office on suspicion of mistreatment and murder of forced labourers, Reiser was imprisoned shortly afterwards, but released from custody in the spring of 1950 due to insufficient evidence. In the following year, the courts in Karlsruhe and Stuttgart dropped all prosecutions against Reiser. In the same year, Reiser passed the Denazification commission in Stuttgart.

== Gehlen organisation ==
After the war, the emerging German intelligence service that was run by Reinhard Gehlen were interested in knowing whether the Soviet Red Orchestra espionage group was still operating in Europe. For Reiser, who had contact with several Gehlen employees after the war, there was virtually no aspect of his previous life that would have precluded him from being recruited into the Gehlen organisation. Even though Reiser was a former Nazi, Gestapo officer and member of the SS and SD, his work experience along with his anti-communist views and self-confessed reliability and loyalty to German self-interest, made him ideally suited to the organisation, in the period leading up to the Cold War. Reiser was recruited on the 15 April 1950 by the former Nazi Alfred Benzinger and assigned employee number V-2629. to the dismay of the American Counterintelligence Corps who also wanted to hire him. He was based at the General Representative Office (Generalverträtung L, GV L) department, located in Karlsruhe. Reiser employed a number of aliases during his career with the Gehlen organisation that included Hans Reiher, Hans Roesner, Hugo Reger, Hugo Hoss, Hans Reichardt. To the casual observer in his office in Karlsruhe, Reiser appeared as an industrial clerk and electrician.

During his initial review in the organisation he was rated as "excellent, [an] expert on Rote Kapelle issues [as well as a] reliable and diligent worker with rich experience". In his reports for the organisation, Reiser always denied his involvement with the Sicherheitsdienst and even claimed that his joining the security police was not at all related to his membership in the SS. However, he never denied working for the Gestapo as he saw his intelligence work as a continuation of the type of actions he took against anti-Nazi's while working for the Gestapo. One of his first actions was to denounce all his former colleagues as communists.

=== Domestic spying ===
When the Gehlen organisation turned to domestic espionage to identify and counter the infiltration of communists agents into Germany, a new department was created to monitor several thousand people in the republic who were suspected of being under Soviet influence. To execute domestic operations, the Gehlen organisation used the GV L. The GV L drew up a location report that identified the area around Lake Constance as likely containing an active cell. In April 1950, Reiser used the location report to write his first report on the Rote Kapelle. He claimed that the Rote Kapelle was centred in Berlin which was false and also claimed that the Yugoslavs and Czechoslovak resistance were part of the network and described how to destroy them. In essence, the report was full of half-truths, conjecture and speculation. Later in 1950, Reiser produced another version of the report which ran to almost 400 pages.

The sources he used to create the report were equally dubious including documents from the Nazi judge and apologist Manfred Roeder, who by 1951 was communicating directly with the Gehlen organisation. Among the reports that Roeder provided was a denouncement of the activities of the radio station Nordwestdeutscher Rundfunk (NWDR) who be believed were Red Orchestra. In February 1951, Reiser was put in touch with the public prosecutor Hans-Jürgen Finck of Lüneburg who investigated Roeder on behalf of a group of Red Orchestra survivors and relatives including Adolf Grimme beginning in 1949. Finck produced a 1732-page report in 1951, half of it recording in detail the supposed crimes of the Red Orchestra. In April 1951, Roeder requested a copy of the report along with witness testimonies from the presiding judge in the case and these became an important source. Another important source for Reiser was decrypts obtained from Abwehr officer and later author Wilhelm Flicke (1897–1957), who during the war was a cryptanalyst at an OKW/Chi intercept station in Lauf. Flicke had hundreds of deciphered dispatches from Red Orchestra communications, that he turned over to Reiser. The GV L used these sources along with others, which contained no actual information on current Soviet intelligence operations in Europe to evaluate suspects as potential Soviet espionage agents or for Soviet links. Most has little evidence of any links, merely ties through employment to the GDR.

=== Operation "Fadenkreuz" ===
By August 1951, Reiser began planning Operation "Fadenkreuz"(Operation Crosshairs) to target Red Orchestra suspects. The plan was approved in November 1951 with the knowledge of the CIA. 30 suspects were chosen from the Lake Constance area with the largest supposed Soviet cell at the NWDR radio station being the likely location. Of particular note to Reiser was the NWDR general manager Adolf Grimme, the former resistance fighter who survived the war. During the war Grimme has been associate of Arvid Harnack and friend of Günther Weisenborn and Adam Kuckhoff. Without a shred of proof, Reiser cast Grimme as a Soviet agent who had been involved in anti-state communist activities since the 1930s and who he believed be a Soviet agent after the war.

In addition to following communists, Reiser targeted former members of conservative resistance groups that were known during the war as Schwarze Kapelle ("Black Orchestra"). In 1951, he published a report for the GV L on a former Gestapo operation known as "Depositenkasse", which was a 1942 investigation into currency smuggling by Abwehr officer Wilhelm Schmidhuber that implicated Abwehr officers Hans von Dohnanyi, Dietrich Bonhoeffer and Josef Müller. Reiser was particularly suspicious of Müller, who was a resistance fighter during the war and was an active supporter of denazification.

During the operation, dozens of people were suspected of activities they didn't commit, often on the basis of resentment or having different political beliefs or were anti-Nazis. However, as the Gehlen organisation didn't have executive powers, the operation at best represented a document collection exercise, of filing cabinets filled with reports written from dubious anti-communist and hard-right sources.

=== Decline ===
In the autumn of 1953, the Gehlen organisation dissolved the GV L office, after many staff moved to East Germany. Reiser was moved to a different office, but the Fadenkreuz operation continued under the leadership. Over the next two years, Reiser worked for several different offices within the organisation before being assigned to work in a branch office that covered Frankfurt and Darmstadt areas. He was employed there from 1955 until 1964 when he retired, where he led a small counter-intelligence office leading a team of six employees. In 1957, he was moved to the German civil service when the Gehlen organisation was formally superseded by the Bundesnachrichtendienst (or Federal Intelligence Service) of the Federal Republic of Germany, which still exists. He was not employed as a civil servant, rather just a plain employee which would have meant a higher salary.

== Publication ==
- Reiser, Heinrich, Rote Kapelle Ruckblich Auf Aufbau Organisation Taetigkeit His Zum Zusammenbruch, October 1950 (Red Orchestra Review of Organizational Structure Until Its Collapse)

== Citations ==
=== Bibliography ===
- Brysac, Shareen Blair (2000). Resisting Hitler: Mildred Harnack and the Red Orchestra. New York: Oxford University Press. ISBN 978-0-19-513269-4.
- Goda, Norman J. W. (4 April 2005). "Tracking the Red Orchestra". In Breitman, Richard; Wolfe, Robert (eds.). U.S. Intelligence and the Nazis. Cambridge University Press. ISBN 978-0521617949. "First name also as Josef Reiser as well as Josef Heinrich Reiser, nickname "Heini"."
- Grosse, Heinrich (2005). "Ankläger von Widerstandskämpfern und Apologet des NS-Regimes nach 1945 – Kriegsgerichtsrat Manfred Roeder" [Prosecutor of resistance fighters and apologist for the Nazi regime after 1945 – Military Judge Manfred Roeder]. Kritische Justiz (in German). 38 (1). Nomos Verlagsgesellschaft mbH: 36–55. doi:10.5771/0023-4834-2005-1-36. JSTOR 24240128.
- Kaňák, Petr; Vajskebr, Jan; Zumr, Jan (30 June 2021). "Heinrich Reiser – válečný zločinec ve víru studené války" [Heinrich Reiser – a war criminal in the midst of the Cold War]. Securitas Imperii: Journal for the Study of Modern Dictatorships (in Czech). 38 (1): 230–260. doi:10.53096/YFLY3966.
- Kellerhoff, Sven-Felix (8 October 2016). "Unionspolitiker als sowjetische Agenten gejagt" [Union politicians hunted as Soviet agents] (in German). Berlin: Axel Springer SE. Die Welt.
- Kesaris, Paul. L, ed. (1979). The Rote Kapelle: the CIA's history of Soviet intelligence and espionage networks in Western Europe, 1936-1945. Washington DC: University Publications of America. ISBN 978-0-89093-203-2.
- O'Sullivan, Donal (2010). Dealing with the Devil: Anglo-Soviet Intelligence Cooperation in the Second World War. New York: Peter Lang. ISBN 978-1-4331-0581-4.
- Perrault, Gilles (1969). The Red Orchestra. New York: Schocken Books. ISBN 0805209522.
- Rass, Christoph (2014). "Leben und Legende. Das Sozialprofil eines Geheimdienstes". In Dülffer, Jost (ed.). Die Geschichte der Organisation Gehlen und des BND 1945 - 1968: Umrisse und Einblicke [The History of the Gehlen Organization and the BND 1945-1968. Outlines and Insights] (in German) (1st ed.). Marburg: Unabhängige Historikerkommission zur Erforschung der Geschichte des Bundesnachrichtendienstes 1945 - 1968. ISBN 9783981600018. OCLC 900082571.
- Sälter, Gerhard (8 February 2016a). "Rote Agenten unter uns" [Red agents among us] (in German). Frankfurt: Fazit-Stiftung. Frankfurter Allgemeine Zeitung.
- Sälter, Gerhard (2016b). Phantome des Kalten Krieges: die Organisation Gehlen und die Wiederbelebung des Gestapo-Feindbildes "Rote Kapelle" [Phantoms of the Cold War: the Gehlen Organization and the revival of the Gestapo's enemy image "Red Orchestra"] (in German). Ch. Links Verlag. ISBN 978-3-86153-921-6.
- Stolle, Michael (2001). Die Geheime Staatspolizei in Baden: Personal, Organisation, Wirkung und Nachwirken einer regionalen Verfolgungsbehörde im Dritten Reich [The Secret State Police in Baden: Personnel, Organization, Impact, and Aftermath of a Regional Persecution Authority in the Third Reich.] (in German). Konstanz: UVK Verlagsgesellschaft. ISBN 9783896698209. OCLC 48663422.
- "Völlige Reintegration? Die ehemaligen Gestapo-Mitarbeiter ab 1950 | 1945 - 1984" [Complete reintegration? The former Gestapo employees from 1950]. Haus der Geschichte Baden-Württemberg (in German). Stuttgart.
- Wiegrefe, Klaus (16 February 2011). "Intelligence Agency's Murky Past: The Nazi Criminals Who Became German Spooks". Der Spiegel. ISSN 2195-1349.
- Wolf, Thomas (4 October 2018). Die Entstehung des BND: Aufbau, Finanzierung, Kontrolle [The origins of the BND: structure, financing, control] (in German). Berlin: Ch. Links Verlag. ISBN 978-3-96289-022-3.
- "Research Aid: Cryptonyms and Terms in Declassified CIA Files Nazi War Crimes and Japanese Imperial Government Records Disclosure Acts" (PDF). National Archives. CIA. June 2007. p. 50.
