= Mark C. Yerger =

American writer of Waffen-SS hagiographies

Mark C. Yerger (1955 – 6 September 2016) was an American author of books about the Schutzstaffel (SS) and Waffen-SS of Nazi Germany. He had close contacts to SS veterans, through whom he was able to access private archives, and wrote biographies of commanders and award recipients of the SS and of SS units. Historians of World War II have described Yerger's work as uncritical, hagiographic and whitewashing towards the SS.

== Life ==
Born in Lancaster County, Pennsylvania, Yerger was the son of Richard E. Yerger and Katheryn Woelper Yerger. He had a sister.

== Works ==
Yerger collected photographs and documents about commanders and members of the SS, the SS-Verfügungstruppe and the Waffen-SS. Apart from researching archives in the US and Europe, he sought to contact Waffen-SS veterans and participated in veterans' reunions. Otto Weidinger and Otto Kumm, among others, brought Yerger into contact with other veterans, who provided him with access to information and documents.

Yerger wrote biographies of Weidinger, Kumm and Ernst August Krag as well as several (sometimes multi-volume) works about commanders of the Waffen-SS, the recipients of the German Cross in gold and silver in Waffen-SS and the police, as well as about individual units such as the SS Division "Das Reich", the SS Cavalry Brigade and the SS-Division "Totenkopf". HIAG, the SS veterans' organization, awarded Yerger with the HIAG brooch of honor in gold for his works. Otto Baum, the commander of the Waffen-SS divisions "Das Reich", "Götz von Berlichingen" and "Reichsführer-SS" wrote a preface to Yerger's second volume of Waffen-SS Commanders, in which he complained about unfair treatment in the Nuremberg trials and said that the Waffen-SS was, like the Wehrmacht, not a criminal organization.

=== Historians' assessments ===
Historians have assessed Yerger's writings as "uncritical", "completely inadequate because of their glossing over" or "revisionist". The historian Christoph Rass called Yerger's book Riding East about the SS cavalry brigade a "whitewashing and in its interpretation more than concerning presentation" of the unit's operations. Yerger's book, according to Rass, is "an example of a downplaying and uncritical history of a Waffen-SS unit, whose participation in numerous war crimes is well documented". A telling example of Yerger's treatment of the sources, Rass writes, is that "he cites the thanks of General Schellert to the SS cavalry brigade of 6 November 1941, but only mentions its 'action on the flank' and not also 'in the back' of the division". Martin Cüppers writes that Yerger celebrated Hermann Fegelein as a war hero.

In The Myth of the Eastern Front: The Nazi–Soviet War in American Popular Culture, Ronald Smelser and Edward J. Davies describe Yerger as a "guru" in the scene of those who romanticize the Waffen-SS. According to them, Yerger's work was closest to that of a historian in his reference book Waffen-SS Commanders. But they consider that his objectivity was compromised by the influence of the veterans who served as his sources, and that he unduly romanticized the supposed bravery and sacrifice of the SS. His detailed biographies, according to Smelser and Davies, are no prosopographies, but iconographies, because he focused primarily on his subjects' military performance and their awards and honors. With publications that contain more photographs than text, and a generally hagiographical treatment of their subjects, they write, Yerger's works do not provide a frame for historical interpretation, but create a romanticized world of their own, characterized by bravery and sacrifice. About the participation of SS personnel in war crimes, Yerger wrote only what could not be avoided, according to Smelser and Davies.

== Partial bibliography ==
- Otto Weidinger. Knights Cross with oak leaves and swords : SS-Panzer-Grenadier-Regiment 4 "Der Führer". JJ Fedorowicz Publishing, Winnipeg 1987, ISBN 9780921991021.
- Otto Kumm. Knight's Cross with Oakleaves and Swords : commander, SS-Panzer-Grenadier-Regiment 4 "Der Führer". J.J. Fedorowicz Pub, Winnipeg, Man., Canada 1989, ISBN 9780921991021.
- Knights of Steel. The structure, development and personalities of the 2. SS-Panzer-Division "Das Reich". 1. Auflage. Yerger, Lancaster, Pa. 1994, ISBN 9780964166103.
- Images of the Waffen-SS. A photo chronicle of Germany's elite troops. Schiffer Publishing, Atglen, PA 1996, ISBN 0764300784.
- Riding East. The SS Cavalry Brigade in Poland and Russia, 1939-1942. Schiffer Publishing, Atglen, PA 1996, ISBN 9780764300608.
- SS-Sturmbannführer Ernst August Krag. Träger des Ritterkreuzes mit Eichenlaub, Kommandeur SS-Sturmgeschützabteilung 2, SS-Panzer-Aufklärungsabteilung 2; "Das Reich. Schiffer Publishing, Atglen, PA 1996, ISBN 0764300490.
- Allgemeine-SS. The commands, units and leaders of the general SS. Schiffer, Atglen Pa. 1997, ISBN 0-7643-0145-4.
- Waffen-SS Commanders. The army, corps, and divisional leaders of a legend. Schiffer, Atglen 1997.
- Streifzüge. Ein Photoalbum der Waffen-SS. Podzun-Pallas, Wölfersheim-Berstadt 2000, ISBN 9783790907100.
- German Cross in Silver. Holders of the SS and police. 1. Auflage. Bender, San Jose Calif. 2002, ISBN 0-912138-87-4.
- German Cross in Gold. Holders of the SS and police. R. James Bender Pub, San Jose, CA 2003-<c2014>, ISBN 1932970282.
- With Ignacio Arrondo: Totenkopf. The structure, development, and personalities of the 3.SS-Panzer Division. Helion & Company Limited, Solihull 2015, ISBN 1910777099.
