= 56th Infantry Division (German Empire) =

56th Infantry Division (56. Infanterie-Division)
- Active: 1915–19
- Country: German Empire
- Branch: Army
- Type: Infantry
- Size: Approx. 15,000
- Engagements: World War I: Gorlice-Tarnów Offensive, Lemberg (1915), 2nd Champagne, Verdun, Somme, Arras

The 56th Infantry Division (56. Infanterie-Division) was a division of the Imperial German Army. It was formed during World War I and dissolved with the demobilization of the German Army in 1919.

== Formation and organization ==
The 56th Infantry Division was formed on March 5, 1915, and began organizing itself over the next two months. It received the 35th Fusilier Regiment (Füsilier-Regiment Prinz Heinrich von Preußen (Brandenburgisches) Nr. 35) from the 6th Infantry Division, the 88th Infantry Regiment (2. Nassauisches Infanterie-Regiment Nr. 88) from the 21st Infantry Division, and the 118th Infantry Regiment (Infanterie-Regiment Prinz Carl (4. Großherzogl. Hessisches) Nr. 118) from the 25th Infantry Division. The 35th Fusiliers was a Prussian regiment from Brandenburg, the 88th Infantry was a Prussian regiment from the former Duchy of Nassau, and the 118th Infantry was from the Grand Duchy of Hesse. The 56th Infantry Division's order of battle on March 7, 1915, was as follows:

- 112.Infanterie-Brigade:
  - Infanterie-Regiment Nr.35
  - Infanterie-Regiment Nr.88
  - Infanterie-Regiment Nr.118
  - Radfahr-Kompanie Nr. 56
- 4.Eskadron/Braunschweigisches Husaren-Regiment Nr. 17
- 56.Feldartillerie-Brigade:
  - Feldartillerie-Regiment Nr.111
  - Feldartillerie-Regiment Nr.112
  - Fußartillerie-Bataillon Nr.56
- Pionier-Kompanie Nr.111
- Pionier-Kompanie Nr.112.

== Combat chronicle ==
After organizing and training in the Champagne region of France, the division was transported to the Eastern Front. It participated in the Gorlice-Tarnów Offensive of 1915, and the Battle of Lemberg. At the end of June 1915, the division was transported back to the Western Front.

The division saw action from September through November 1915 in the Second Battle of Champagne. After a period in the trenchlines and then rest in the army reserve, in May 1915, the division entered the Battle of Verdun, fighting in the struggle for the Dead Man's Hill. The division joined the Battle of the Somme at the end of August 1916. In October 1916, the division received the 47th Ersatz Infantry Brigade as reinforcement, and returned to the final phase of the Battle of the Somme in November. The 47th Ersatz Infantry Brigade was transferred from the division in January 1917. The division remained in positional warfare along the Somme and in Flanders in early 1917. It faced the British offensive at Arras in April and May, and then after more time in the trenchlines, it returned to Verdun in August. The division remained at Verdun into early 1918, and then returned to the Flanders region. It ended the war in battle before the Antwerp-Maas defensive line.

Allied intelligence rated the division as a second class division, mainly due to the heavy fighting it had seen and the losses it had taken.

== Late-war organization ==
Given its late formation, the division underwent fewer structural changes than other divisions by late-war. It became more Hessian in nature, losing the 35th Brandenburg Fusiliers to the 228th Infantry Division and receiving the 186th Infantry Regiment (Infanterie-Regiment Nr.186), a regiment formed in the Grand Duchy of Hesse and the Prussian Province of Hesse-Nassau. The division's order of battle on October 19, 1918, was as follows:

- 112.Infanterie-Brigade:
  - Infanterie-Regiment Nr.88
  - Infanterie-Regiment Nr.118
  - Infanterie-Regiment Nr.186
- 4.Eskadron/Braunschweigisches Husaren-Regiment Nr. 17
- Artillerie-Kommandeur Nr. 56:
  - Feldartillerie-Regiment Nr.112
  - Fußartillerie-Bataillon Nr.56
- Pionier-Bataillon Nr.139
- Divisions-Nachrichten-Kommandeur Nr. 56
