= Reinhard von Scheffer-Boyadel =

German general (1851–1925)

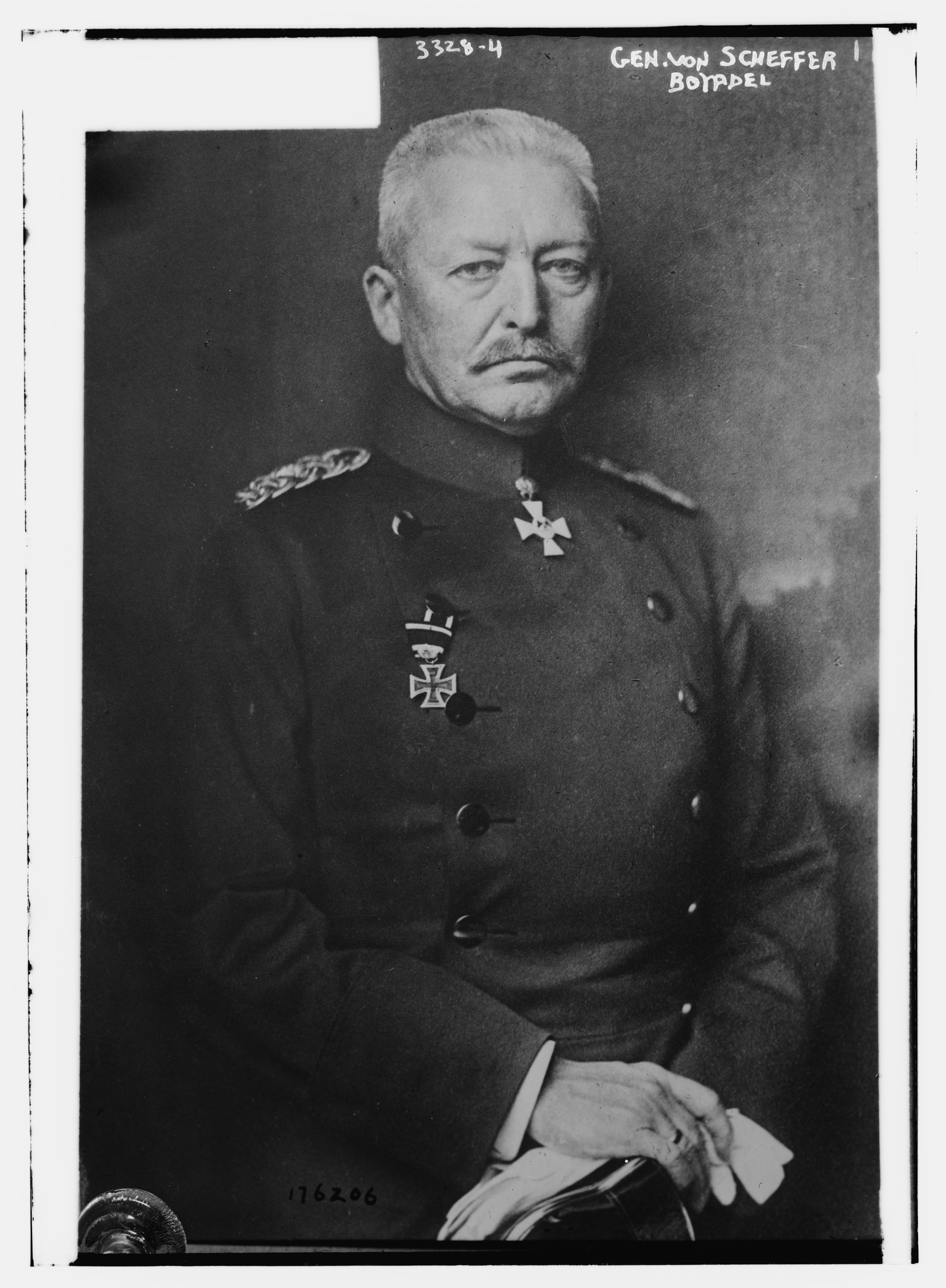
- Born: Reinhard Gottlob Georg Heinrich Freiherr von Scheffer-Boyadel; 28 March 1851; Hanau, Electorate of Hesse
- Died: 8 November 1925 (aged 74); Boyadel, Prussia
- Military career
- Allegiance: German Empire
- Branch: Imperial German Army
- Rank: General der Infanterie
- Commands: XI Corps; XXV Reserve Corps; XVII Reserve Corps; Army Detachment Scheffer; 67th Corps
- Conflicts: Franco-Prussian War; World War I: Eastern Front; Battle of Łódź (1914)
- Awards: Pour le Merite

Reinhard Gottlob Georg Heinrich Freiherr von Scheffer-Boyadel (28 March 1851 – 8 November 1925) was a general of the Imperial German Army during World War I, reaching the rank of General der Infanterie.

== Early life and career ==
Scheffer-Boyadel was born on 25 March 1851 in Hanau. In 1870 he volunteered for service in the Franco-Prussian War. Afterwards, in 1871, he became a lieutenant in the Prussian Army. He was ennobled in 1890 and became a baron in 1906. He served on the Great General Staff, commanded a guards division and later a corps until he retired in 1913 at the age of 62. He was recalled to active service in the fall of 1914 and was given command of the newly organised XXV Reserve Corps which became a part of the 9th Army under August von Mackensen.

== World War I ==
Between 12 and 16 November 1914 three corps of the Ninth Army completely smashed the left wing of the Russian 1st Army, Scheffer's corps attributing much to the success. During the fighting his corps managed to advance seventy-five miles in just five days. After breaking through the Russian defensive line Scheffer's corps continued towards Łódź. His corps, together with a single division as reinforcements, arrived to an area to the east of Łódź by 21 November, which placed them behind the Russian 2nd Army which was organising the defense of that area. Soon he attacked the Russians from the rear. Reserves from Warsaw and elements of the 1st and 5th armies were quickly sent to help the defenders and approached from all sides. Now Scheffer was in a dangerous position, soon to be encircled by Russian troops approaching from all sides. The Germans were now around ~50.000 strong and heavily outnumbered by their opponents. About half of the Russian 2nd Army was sent to close the encirclement while the other half defended Łódź with their entrenchments. Scheffer continued to advance on Łódź, posting major units to defend his rear but Russian resistance turned out be too formidable, he wasn't able to take Łódź. By now about ~200.000 Russian troops were encircling his position, Mackensen told Scheffer by radio to extract his troops from their current position and try to return to German lines but that seemed impossible. The Russians by now were so sure of victory that they brought up trains from Warsaw to transport the expected prisoners. Scheffer decided to attack eastward, the direction the Russians would least expect. He took the Russians by surprise and broke through, he began his march north. The Russians failed to reestablish the encirclement. Fifteen miles from German lines Scheffer would inflict a decisive defeat on a Russian division. On 26 November Scheffer's corps took up positions in the German frontline once again. Scheffer's forces had lost ~4.300 men but inflicted at least three times as much on the four times larger Russian forces, he made it out with ~16.000 prisoners and 64 captured guns. T. Dupuy called it one of the greatest feats in military history, describing it as almost unbelievable. For this action Scheffer-Boyadel received the Pour le Mérite on December 2, 1914.

== Later life and death ==
He died on 8 November 1925 in Boyadel.
