= 64th Corps (German Empire) =

64th Corps (Württemberg) (Generalkommando zbV 64 (Württemberg))
- Flag of the Staff of a Generalkommando (1871–1918)
- Active: January 1917-1919
- Disbanded: 1919
- Country: German Empire
- Branch: Army
- Engagements: World War I

Insignia
- Abbreviation: Genkdo zbV 64

The 64th Corps (Württemberg) (German: Generalkommando zbV 64 (Württemberg)) was a corps formation of the German Army in World War I. It was formed in January 1917 and was still in existence at the end of the war.

== Chronicle ==
The 64th Corps (z.b.V.) was formed in January 1917.

With the onset of trench warfare, the German Army recognised that it was no longer possible to maintain the traditional Corps unit, that is, one made up of two divisions. Whereas at some times (and in some places) a Corps of two divisions was sufficient, at other times 5 or 6 divisions were necessary. Therefore, under the Hindenburg regime (from summer 1916), new Corps headquarters were created without organic divisions. These new Corps were designated General Commands for Special Use (German: Generalkommandos zur besonderen Verwendung).

By the end of the war, the Corps was serving on the Western Front as part of Armee-Abteilung B, Heeresgruppe Herzog Albrecht von Württemberg with the following composition:

- 6th Bavarian Landwehr Division
- 4th Cavalry Schützen Division
- 7th Cavalry Schützen Division

The units assigned were lower quality Landwehr and Cavalry Schützen Divisions indicative of the relatively quiet sector that the Armee-Abteilung was operating in, on the extreme southern end of the Western Front, to the north of Basel.

== Commanders ==
The 64th Corps was commanded throughout its existence by General der Kavallerie Wilhelm Karl, Duke of Urach. Wilhelm was the head of the morganatic Urach branch of the House of Württemberg. The corps was a part of the Army Group D commanded by Duke Wilhelm's cousin, Albrecht, Duke of Württemberg.

== Glossary ==
- Armee-Abteilung or Army Detachment in the sense of "something detached from an Army". It is not under the command of an Army so is in itself a small Army.
- Armee-Gruppe or Army Group in the sense of a group within an Army and under its command, generally formed as a temporary measure for a specific task.
- Heeresgruppe or Army Group in the sense of a number of armies under a single commander.

== See also ==
- German Army (German Empire)
- German Army order of battle, Western Front (1918)

== Bibliography ==
- Cron, Hermann (2002). Imperial German Army 1914-18: Organisation, Structure, Orders-of-Battle [first published: 1937]. Helion & Co. ISBN 1-874622-70-1.
- Ellis, John; Cox, Michael (1993). The World War I Databook. Aurum Press Ltd. ISBN 1-85410-766-6.
