= Manfred von Richthofen (general) =

German general (1855-1939)

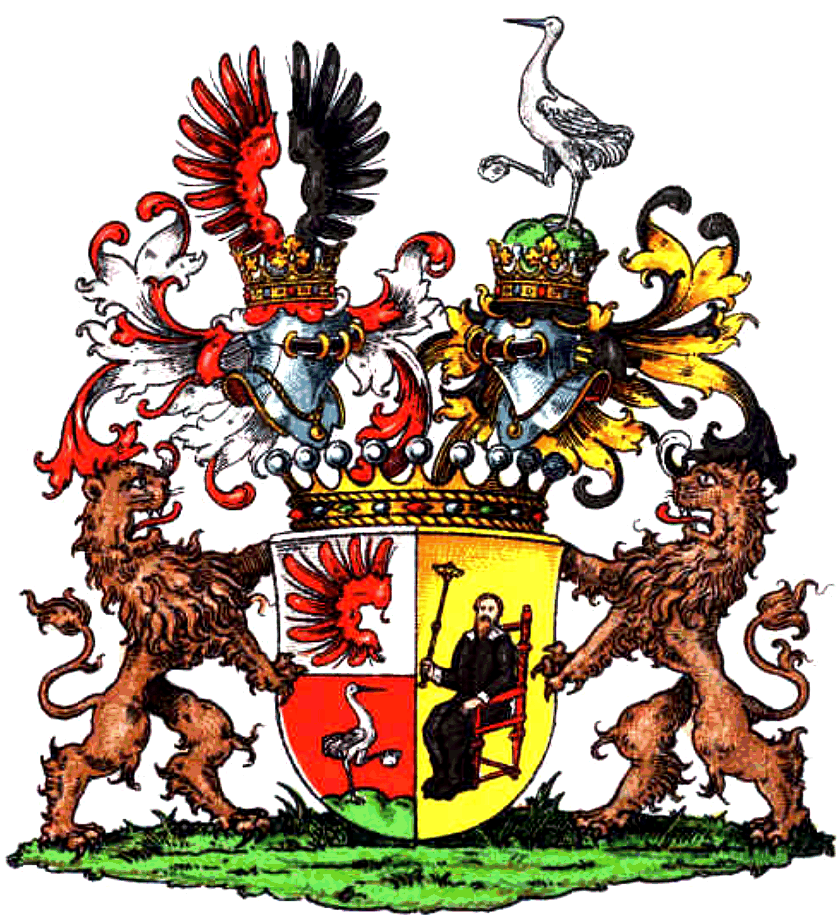
- Coat of arms of the Richthofen family
- Born: 24 May 1855; Gut Barzdorf, Silesia (now Bartoszówek, Poland)
- Died: 28 November 1939 (aged 84); Bersdorf, Silesia (near Targoszyn, Poland)
- Relatives: Karl von Grolman (grandfather); Manfred von Richthofen (great nephew); Wolfram von Richthofen (nephew and adoptive son); see Richthofen family for more
- Military career
- Allegiance: German Empire
- Branch: Army
- Service years: 1874–1918
- Rank: General der Kavallerie
- Commands: Guards Cavalry Division; 6th Infantry Division; I Cavalry Corps; XXXVIII Reserve Corps; XXV Reserve Corps; 53rd Corps; Deputy commander of Guards Corps
- Conflicts: World War I Battle of the Frontiers First Battle of the Marne Battle of Łódź
- Awards: Pour le Mérite; Knight of Justice of the Order of Saint John

Karl Ernst Manfred Freiherr von Richthofen (24 May 1855 – 28 November 1939) was a German General der Kavallerie (General of the Cavalry) during World War I and recipient of the order Pour le Mérite, known informally as the Blue Max. Richthofen was a great uncle of his more famous namesake Manfred von Richthofen, known as the Red Baron, who was his godson and named after him.

== Early life ==
Manfred von Richthofen was born on 24 May 1855 in Gut Barzdorf, Silesia (now Bartoszówek, Poland). He entered the Imperial German Army in 1874 as an ensign in the 4th (Westphalian) Cuirassier Regiment. By April 1902 he had risen to lieutenant-colonel in command of the Gardes du Corps Cavalry Regiment, personal bodyguard of the German Emperor Wilhelm II; and was assigned as his aide-de-camp in the following year.

In 1906 he was promoted to Oberst (colonel), and in March 1908 took command of the 2nd Guards Cavalry Brigade in Potsdam. In 1910, he was promoted to Generalmajor (brigadier-General), and in February 1913 he took command of the Guards Cavalry Division with a promotion to Generalleutnant (major-general). In February 1914 he moved on to command the 6th Infantry Division at Brandenburg.

== World War I ==
At the beginning of World War I, Richthofen became commander of I Cavalry Corps (composed of 5th Cavalry and Guards Cavalry Divisions) preceding 3rd Army. These formed part of the right wing of the forces for the Schlieffen Plan offensive in August 1914 on the Western Front and took part in the Battle of the Frontiers and the First Battle of the Marne.

The corps was transferred to the Eastern Front on 6 November 1914 and joined the newly formed 9th Army. Richthofen and his corps played an important role in the Battle of Łódź, where his corps took part in breaking out the encircled XXV Reserve Corps.

In September 1916, Richthofen became commander of XXXVIII Reserve Corps until November when he became commander of the XXV Reserve Corps. In March 1917, Richthofen was given command of 53rd Corps (z.b.V.) until January 1918, when he became Kommandierender General (deputy commander) of the Guards Corps in Berlin, his highest rank. He surrendered the Berliner Stadtschloss without a fight in order to keep intact the building and the works of art contained in it.

On 18 January 1918, Richthofen was awarded the Order Pour le Mérite, known informally as the Blue Max. On 2 May 1918, he attended a memorial service for his grandnephew Manfred von Richthofen who was killed in action on April 21.

== Later life ==
On 10 November 1918, Richthofen handed in his resignation, which was accepted. He died on 28 November 1939 on his Barzdorf estate in Silesia, aged 84. As he had no children and he wished to keep his estate in the family, he legally adopted his nephew Wolfram Freiherr von Richthofen, later a Generalfeldmarschall of the Luftwaffe in the Second World War.

== Awards ==
- Order of the Red Eagle, II Class with Oak Leaves
- Order of the Crown (Prussia), II Class with Star
- Order of Saint John, Knight of Justice
- Preußisches Dienstauszeichnungskreuz (Prussian Service Award)
- Reußisches Ehrenkreuz, I Class with Crown
- Waldecksches Militär-Verdienstkreuz, III Class
- Waldecksches Verdienstkreuz, I Class
- Knight's Cross of the Order of the Crown (Württemberg) with Lions
- Commander of the Order of St Alexander (Bulgaria)
- Commander of the Order of the Crown of Italy
- Knight's Cross of the Order of Franz Joseph (Austria-Hungary)
- Commander of the Order of the Lion and the Sun (Persia)
- Order of St. Anna I Class (Russia)
- Military Merit Order III class (Spain)
- Iron Cross (1914) II and I Class
- Pour le Mérite awarded 18 January 1918

== See also ==
- German Army (German Empire)
- German Army order of battle (1914)
- German cavalry in World War I

== Bibliography ==
- Cron, Hermann (2002). Imperial German Army 1914–18: Organisation, Structure, Orders-of-Battle [first published: 1937]. Helion & Co. ISBN 978-1-874622-70-3.
- Ellis, John; Cox, Michael (1993). The World War I Databook. Aurum Press Ltd. ISBN 1-85410-766-6.
- Möller, Hanns (1935). Geschichte der Ritter des Ordens pour le mérite im Weltkrieg (in German). Vol. II. Verlag Bernard & Graefe, Berlin. pp. 193–194.
- Hildebrand, Karl-Friedrich; Zweng, Christian (2002). Die Ritter des Ordens Pour le Mérite des I. Weltkriegs (in German). Vol. 3: P–Z. Biblio Verlag, Bissendorf. pp. 119–120. ISBN 3-7648-2586-3.
