= XVIII Corps (German Empire) =

1899–1919 German Army corps-sized formation

XVIII Army Corps XVIII. Armee-Korps
- Flag of the Staff of a Generalkommando (1871–1918)
- Active: 1 April 1899–1919
- Country: German Empire
- Branch: Army
- Type: Corps
- Size: Approximately 44,000 (on mobilisation in 1914)
- Garrison/HQ: Frankfurt am Main/Untermain-Kai 19
- Shoulder strap piping: Light Blue
- Engagements: World War I Battle of the Frontiers Battle of Verdun

Insignia
- Abbreviation: XVIII AK

The XVIII Army Corps / XVIII AK (German: XVIII. Armee-Korps) was a corps level command of the German Army before and during World War I.

As the German Army expanded in the latter part of the 19th century, the XVIII Army Corps was set up on 1 April 1899 in Frankfurt am Main as the Generalkommando (headquarters) for the district of Wiesbaden and the Grand Duchy of Hesse. It took over command of 21st Division from XI Corps and the previously separate 25th (Grand Ducal Hessian) Division. It was assigned to the VII Army Inspectorate, but joined the 4th Army at the start of the First World War.

It was still in existence at the end of the war, serving in the 17th Army, Heeresgruppe Kronprinz Rupprecht on the Western Front.

== Peacetime organisation ==
The 25 peacetime Corps of the German Army (Guards, I – XXI, I – III Bavarian) had a reasonably standardised organisation. Each consisted of two divisions with usually two infantry brigades, one field artillery brigade and a cavalry brigade each. Each brigade normally consisted of two regiments of the appropriate type, so each Corps normally commanded 8 infantry, 4 field artillery and 4 cavalry regiments. There were exceptions to this rule:

V, VI, VII, IX and XIV Corps each had a 5th infantry brigade (so 10 infantry regiments)
II, XIII, XVIII and XXI Corps had a 9th infantry regiment
I, VI and XVI Corps had a 3rd cavalry brigade (so 6 cavalry regiments)
the Guards Corps had 11 infantry regiments (in 5 brigades) and 8 cavalry regiments (in 4 brigades).

Each Corps also directly controlled a number of other units. This could include one or more

Foot Artillery Regiment
Jäger Battalion
Pioneer Battalion
Train Battalion

Peacetime organization of the Corps
Corps	Division	Brigade	Units	Garrison
XVIII Corps	21st Division	41st Infantry Brigade	87th (1st Nassau) Infantry	Mainz
XVIII Corps	21st Division	41st Infantry Brigade	88th (2nd Nassau) Infantry	Mainz, II Bn at Hanau
XVIII Corps	21st Division	42nd Infantry Brigade	80th (Kurhessian) Fusiliers "von Gersdorff"	Wiesbaden, II Bn at Bad Homburg
XVIII Corps	21st Division	42nd Infantry Brigade	81st (1st Kurhessian) Infantry "Landgrave Frederick I of Hesse-Cassel"	Frankfurt am Main
XVIII Corps	21st Division	21st Field Artillery Brigade	27th (1st Nassau) Field Artillery "Oranien"	Mainz, Wiesbaden
XVIII Corps	21st Division	21st Field Artillery Brigade	63rd (2nd Nassau) Field Artillery	Frankfurt am Main
XVIII Corps	21st Division	21st Cavalry Brigade	6th (Magdeburg) Dragoons	Mainz
XVIII Corps	21st Division	21st Cavalry Brigade	6th (Thuringian) Uhlans	Hanau
XVIII Corps	25th Division	49th Infantry Brigade	115th (1st Grand Ducal Hessian) Lifeguard Infantry	Darmstadt
XVIII Corps	25th Division	49th Infantry Brigade	116th (2nd Grand Ducal Hessian) Infantry "Emperor William"	Gießen
XVIII Corps	25th Division	49th Infantry Brigade	168th (5th Grand Ducal Hessian) Infantry	Offenbach, I Bn at Butzbach, III Bn at Friedberg
XVIII Corps	25th Division	50th Infantry Brigade	117th (3rd Grand Ducal Hessian) Life Infantry "Grand Duchess"	Mainz
XVIII Corps	25th Division	50th Infantry Brigade	118th (4th Grand Ducal Hessian) Infantry "Prince Charles"	Worms
XVIII Corps	25th Division	25th Field Artillery Brigade	25th (1st Grand Ducal Hessian) Field Artillery	Darmstadt
XVIII Corps	25th Division	25th Field Artillery Brigade	61st (2nd Grand Ducal Hessian) Field Artillery	Darmstadt, Babenhausen
XVIII Corps	25th Division	25th Cavalry Brigade	23rd Guards Dragoons (1st Grand Ducal Hessian)	Darmstadt
XVIII Corps	25th Division	25th Cavalry Brigade	24th Life Dragoons (2nd Grand Ducal Hessian)	Darmstadt
XVIII Corps	Corps Troops		8th Fortress Machine Gun Abteilung	Mainz
XVIII Corps	Corps Troops		3rd (General-Feldzeugmeister) (Brandenburg) Foot Artillery	Mainz
XVIII Corps	Corps Troops		21st (1st Nassau) Pioneer Battalion	Mainz
XVIII Corps	Corps Troops		25th (2nd Nassau) (Fortress-)Pioneer Battalion	Mainz
XVIII Corps	Corps Troops		7th (Royal Saxon) (Fortress-) Telephone Company	Mainz
XVIII Corps	Corps Troops		18th (Grand Ducal Hessian) Train Battalion	Darmstadt
XVIII Corps	Corps Troops		2nd Railway Regiment	Hanau
XVIII Corps	Corps Troops		3rd Railway Regiment	Hanau

== World War I ==
=== Organisation on mobilisation ===
On mobilization, on 2 August 1914, the Corps was restructured. The 25th Cavalry Brigade was withdrawn to form part of the 3rd Cavalry Division and the 21st Cavalry Brigade was broken up and its regiments assigned to the divisions as reconnaissance units. The 168th Infantry Regiment was assigned to the 25th Reserve Division in XVIII Reserve Corps. Divisions received engineer companies and other support units from the Corps headquarters. In summary, XVIII Corps mobilised with 24 infantry battalions, 8 machine gun companies (48 machine guns), 8 cavalry squadrons, 24 field artillery batteries (144 guns), 4 heavy artillery batteries (16 guns), 3 pioneer companies and an aviation detachment.

Initial wartime organization of the Corps
Corps	Division	Brigade	Units
XVIII Corps	21st Division	41st Infantry Brigade	87th Infantry Regiment
XVIII Corps	21st Division	41st Infantry Brigade	88th Infantry Regiment
XVIII Corps	21st Division	42nd Infantry Brigade	80th Fusilier Regiment
XVIII Corps	21st Division	42nd Infantry Brigade	81st Infantry Regiment
XVIII Corps	21st Division	21st Field Artillery Brigade	27th Field Artillery Regiment
XVIII Corps	21st Division	21st Field Artillery Brigade	63rd Field Artillery Regiment
XVIII Corps	21st Division		6th Uhlan Regiment
XVIII Corps	21st Division		1st Company, 21st Pioneer Battalion
XVIII Corps	21st Division		21st Divisional Pontoon Train
XVIII Corps	21st Division		1st Medical Company
XVIII Corps	21st Division		3rd Medical Company
XVIII Corps	25th Division	49th Infantry Brigade	115th Life Guard Infantry Regiment
XVIII Corps	25th Division	49th Infantry Brigade	116th Infantry Regiment
XVIII Corps	25th Division	50th Infantry Brigade	117th Life Infantry Regiment
XVIII Corps	25th Division	50th Infantry Brigade	118th Infantry Regiment
XVIII Corps	25th Division	25th Field Artillery Brigade	25th Field Artillery Regiment
XVIII Corps	25th Division	25th Field Artillery Brigade	61st Field Artillery Regiment
XVIII Corps	25th Division		6th Dragoon Regiment
XVIII Corps	25th Division		2nd Company, 21st Pioneer Battalion
XVIII Corps	25th Division		3rd Company, 21st Pioneer Battalion
XVIII Corps	25th Division		25th Divisional Pontoon Train
XVIII Corps	25th Division		2nd Medical Company
XVIII Corps	Corps Troops		I Battalion, 3rd Foot Artillery Regiment
XVIII Corps	Corps Troops		27th Aviation Detachment
XVIII Corps	Corps Troops		18th Corps Pontoon Train
XVIII Corps	Corps Troops		18th Telephone Detachment
XVIII Corps	Corps Troops		21st Pioneer Searchlight Section
XVIII Corps	Corps Troops		Munition Trains and Columns corresponding to II Corps

=== Combat chronicle ===
On mobilisation, XVIII Corps was assigned to the 4th Army forming part of the centre of the forces for the Schlieffen Plan offensive in August 1914. It was still in existence at the end of the war, serving in the 17th Army, Heeresgruppe Kronprinz Rupprecht on the Western Front.

== Commanders ==
The XVIII Corps had the following commanders during its existence:

Dates	Rank	Name
25 March 1899 to 30 April 1904	General der Infanterie	Oskar von Lindequist
1 May 1904 to 12 September 1912	Generalleutnant	Hermann von Eichhorn
13 September 1912 to 20 January 1917	General der Infanterie	Dedo von Schenck
21 January 1917 to 26 August 1918	Generalleutnant	Viktor Albrecht
27 August 1918 to end of the war	Generalleutnant	Günther von Etzel

== See also ==
- German Army order of battle (1914)
- German Army order of battle, Western Front (1918)
- List of Imperial German infantry regiments
- List of Imperial German artillery regiments
- List of Imperial German cavalry regiments

== Bibliography ==
- Cron, Hermann (2002). Imperial German Army 1914–18: Organisation, Structure, Orders-of-Battle [first published: 1937]. Helion & Co. ISBN 1-874622-70-1.
- Ellis, John; Cox, Michael (1993). The World War I Databook. Aurum Press Ltd. ISBN 1-85410-766-6.
- Haythornthwaite, Philip J. (1996). The World War One Source Book. Arms and Armour. ISBN 1-85409-351-7.
- Histories of Two Hundred and Fifty-One Divisions of the German Army which Participated in the War (1914–1918), compiled from records of Intelligence section of the General Staff, American Expeditionary Forces, at General Headquarters, Chaumont, France 1919. The London Stamp Exchange Ltd. 1989 [1920]. ISBN 0-948130-87-3.
- The German Forces in the Field; 7th Revision, 11th November 1918; Compiled by the General Staff, War Office. Imperial War Museum, London and the Battery Press. 1995 [1918]. ISBN 978-1-870423-95-3.
