= 25th (1st Württemberg) Dragoons "Queen Olga" =

Regiment of the Württemberg Army

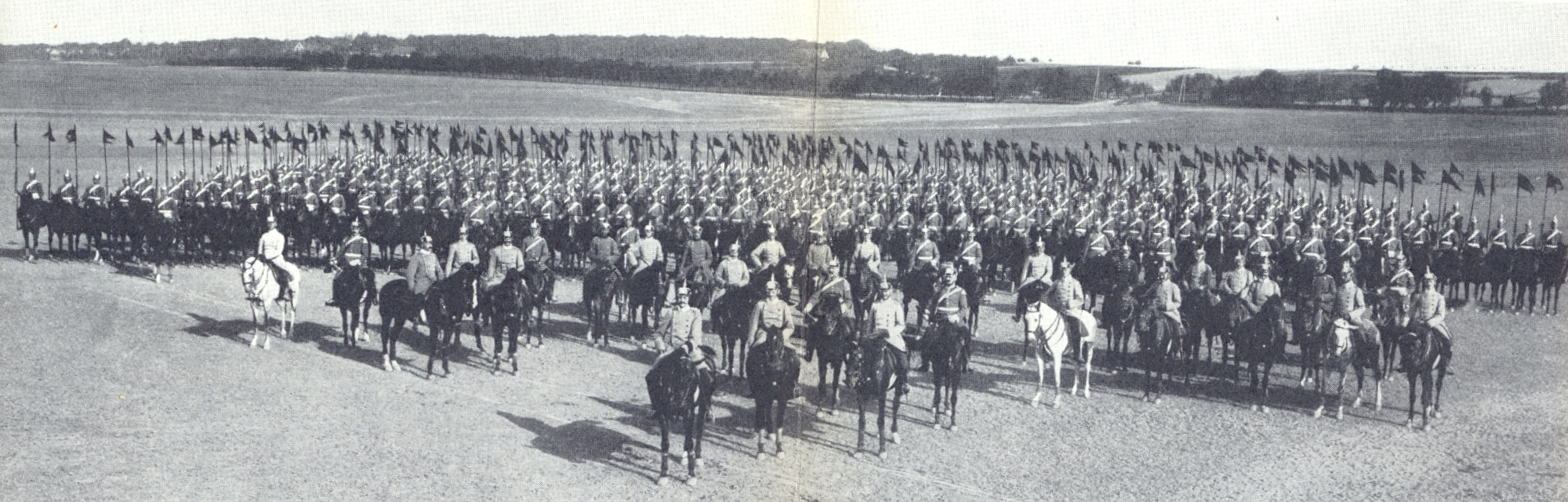
The “Queen Olga” regiment after a drill in summer 1907

The 25th (1st Württemberg) Dragoons “Queen Olga” (Dragoner-Regiment „Königin Olga“ (1. Württembergisches) Nr. 25) were a cavalry regiment of the Army of Württemberg. The regiment was originally formed in 1806 as Chevau-légers, but reorganized as dragoons in 1870. The regiment took part in the Franco-Prussian War and served with the 7th Cavalry Division in World War I.

On 1 May 1919 the regiment was disbanded, with the 1st Squadron/18th Horse bearing its tradition in the new Reichsheer.

== See also ==
- List of Imperial German cavalry regiments
