= Julie M. Weise =

Historian

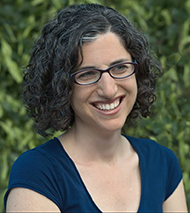
- Awards: Merle Curti Award

Academic background
- Education: B.A., MPhil, PhD, History, 2009, Yale University
- Thesis: Fighting for their place: Mexicans and Mexican Americans in the U.S. South, 1910-2008 (2009)
- Website: history.uoregon.edu/profile/jweise/

Julie Meira Weise is an American historian. She is an associate professor of history at the University of Oregon. After graduating from Yale University, Weise taught at California State University, Long Beach for four years before accepting a placement at the University of Oregon.

== Education and early career ==
Weise earned her Bachelor of Arts, master's degree, and PhD at Yale University. In 2008, Weise published her research paper Mexican Nationalisms, Southern Racisms: Mexicans and Mexican Americans in the U.S. South, 1908-1939 through American Quarterly. She received the George Washington Egleston Historical Prize from Yale and the 2010 NEH Summer Stipend for her dissertation "Fighting for Their Place: Mexicans and Mexican Americans in the U.S. South, 1910-2008."

While completing her degrees, Weise worked amongst Mexico’s president Vicente Fox's administration as a speechwriter and researcher for the cabinet-level Office of the President for Mexicans Living Abroad.

== Career ==
After graduating from Yale University, Weise taught at California State University, Long Beach (CSULB) for four years. While there, she was awarded a 2011-2012 Weatherhead Resident Scholarship to complete the manuscript of her first book Corazón de Dixie: Migration and the Struggle for Rights in the U.S. South and Mexico, 1910–2010. In 2013, Weise left CSULB and accepted an assistant professor of history position at the University of Oregon (U of O).

During her first years at U of O, Weise published Corazón de Dixie: Mexicanos in the U.S. South since 1910 through the University of North Carolina Press. The book details the experiences of Mexicans in the Southeastern part of the United States throughout history, including both cultural and material factors that affected their livelihoods. The book received the 2016 Merle Curti Award from the Organization of American Historians and was a finalist for the CLR James Award. Following the publication of her book, Weise received the Norman H. Brown Faculty Fellowship in the Liberal Arts for 2016-2018 for her "demonstrated excellence in teaching and capacity for superior scholarship." She also developed a four-hour training course to teach U of O faculty how to appropriately support Dreamers.

In 2018, Weise earned a Public Engagement Seed Grant to co-produced a five part series podcast called Nuestro South, which followed Latina people in the South from the Jim Crow era to the present. As a result of the success of her podcast, Weise received a $50,000 public-engagement grant from the Whiting Foundation to transform her podcast into a five-part YouTube series. On May 1, 2020, Weise was the co-recipient of the 2020–21 Presidential Fellowship in Humanistic Study.
