= 53rd Corps (German Empire) =

53rd Corps (Generalkommando zbV 53)
- Flag of the Staff of a Generalkommando (1871–1918)
- Active: September 1916-1919
- Disbanded: 1919
- Country: German Empire
- Branch: Army
- Engagements: World War I

Insignia
- Abbreviation: Genkdo zbV 53

The 53rd Corps (German: Generalkommando zbV 53) was a corps formation of the German Army in World War I. It was formed in September 1916 and was still in existence at the end of the war.

== Chronicle ==
The 53rd Corps (z.b.V.) was formed in September 1916. With the onset of trench warfare, the German Army recognised that it was no longer possible to maintain the traditional Corps unit, that is, one made up of two divisions. Whereas at some times (and in some places) a Corps of two divisions was sufficient, at other times 5 or 6 divisions were necessary. Therefore, under the Hindenburg regime (from summer 1916), new Corps headquarters were created without organic divisions. These new Corps were designated General Commands for Special Use (German: Generalkommandos zur besonderen Verwendung).

== Commanders ==
The 53rd Corps had the following commanders during its existence:

Commander	From	To
Generalleutnant Konstanz von Heineccius	31 August 1916	8 March 1917
General der Kavallerie Manfred von Richthofen	8 March 1917	18 January 1918
Generalleutnant Leo Limbourg	18 January 1918	end of the war

== See also ==
- German Army (German Empire)

== Bibliography ==
- Cron, Hermann (2002). Imperial German Army 1914-18: Organisation, Structure, Orders-of-Battle [first published: 1937]. Helion & Co. ISBN 1-874622-70-1.
- Ellis, John; Cox, Michael (1993). The World War I Databook. Aurum Press Ltd. ISBN 1-85410-766-6.
