= 26th (2nd Württemberg) Dragoons "King" =

Military unit

The 26th (2nd Württemberg) Dragoons “King”(Dragonerregiment „König“ (2. württembergisches) Nr. 26) was a cavalry regiment of the Army of Württemberg. The regiment was originally formed in 1805 as Mounted Rifles but reorganized as dragoons in 1870. In 1891 it was named after Prince William, then Crown Prince, and renamed King upon his accession to the throne as William II of Württemberg. The regiment took part in Napoleon's Russian campaign and fought in the Austro-Prussian War, the Franco-Prussian War, and was part of the 7th Cavalry Division in World War I. On 1 May 1919 the regiment was disbanded, with 4th Squadron/18th Horse bearing its tradition in the new Reichsheer.

== See also ==
- List of Imperial German cavalry regiments
