= XXXVIII Reserve Corps =

XXXVIII Reserve Corps XXXVIII. Reserve-Korps
- Flag of the Staff of a Generalkommando (1871–1918)
- Active: December 1914 - post November 1918
- Country: German Empire
- Type: Corps
- Size: Approximately 26,000 (on formation)
- Engagements: World War I

The XXXVIII Reserve Corps (German: XXXVIII. Reserve-Korps / XXXVIII RK) was a corps level command of the German Army in World War I.

== Formation ==
XXXVIII Reserve Corps was formed in December 1914. It was part of the second wave of new Corps formed in the early stages of World War I consisting of XXXVIII - XXXXI Reserve Corps of 75th - 82nd Reserve Divisions (plus 8th Bavarian Reserve Division). The personnel was predominantly made up of kriegsfreiwillige (wartime volunteers) who did not wait to be called up. From 28 March 1915 to 31 December 1917 it was known as Beskidenkorps (Beskids Corps). The Corps was still in existence at the end of the war in the 3rd Army, Heeresgruppe Deutscher Kronprinz on the Western Front.

=== Structure on formation ===
On formation in December 1914, XXXVIII Reserve Corps consisted of two divisions. but was weaker than an Active Corps

- the divisions were organised as triangular rather than square divisions with three infantry regiments rather than four, but had a brigade of two field artillery regiments
- Reserve Infantry Regiments consisted of three battalions but lacked a machine gun company
- Reserve Cavalry Detachments were much smaller than the Reserve Cavalry Regiments formed on mobilisation
- Reserve Field Artillery Regiments consisted of two abteilungen (1 gun and 1 howitzer) of three batteries each, but each battery had just 4 guns (rather than 6 of the Active and the Reserve Regiments formed on mobilisation)

In summary, XXXVIII Reserve Corps mobilised with 18 infantry battalions, 2 cavalry detachments, 24 field artillery batteries (96 guns), 2 cyclist companies and 2 pioneer companies.

Corps	Division	Brigade	Units
XXXVIII Reserve Corps	75th Reserve Division	75th Reserve Infantry Brigade	249th Reserve Infantry Regiment
XXXVIII Reserve Corps	75th Reserve Division	75th Reserve Infantry Brigade	250th Reserve Infantry Regiment
XXXVIII Reserve Corps	75th Reserve Division	75th Reserve Infantry Brigade	251st Reserve Infantry Regiment
XXXVIII Reserve Corps	75th Reserve Division	75th Reserve Field Artillery Brigade	55th Reserve Field Artillery Regiment
XXXVIII Reserve Corps	75th Reserve Division	75th Reserve Field Artillery Brigade	57th Reserve Field Artillery Regiment
XXXVIII Reserve Corps	75th Reserve Division		75th Reserve Cavalry Detachment
XXXVIII Reserve Corps	75th Reserve Division		75th Reserve Cyclist Company
XXXVIII Reserve Corps	75th Reserve Division		75th Reserve Pioneer Company
XXXVIII Reserve Corps	76th Reserve Division	76th Reserve Infantry Brigade	252nd Reserve Infantry Regiment
XXXVIII Reserve Corps	76th Reserve Division	76th Reserve Infantry Brigade	253rd Reserve Infantry Regiment
XXXVIII Reserve Corps	76th Reserve Division	76th Reserve Infantry Brigade	254th Reserve Infantry Regiment
XXXVIII Reserve Corps	76th Reserve Division	76th Reserve Field Artillery Brigade	56th Reserve Field Artillery Regiment
XXXVIII Reserve Corps	76th Reserve Division	76th Reserve Field Artillery Brigade	58th Reserve Field Artillery Regiment
XXXVIII Reserve Corps	76th Reserve Division		76th Reserve Cavalry Detachment
XXXVIII Reserve Corps	76th Reserve Division		76th Reserve Cyclist Company
XXXVIII Reserve Corps	76th Reserve Division		76th Reserve Pioneer Company

== Commanders ==
XXXVIII Reserve Corps had the following commanders during its existence:

From	Rank	Name
24 December 1914	General der Kavallerie	Georg von der Marwitz
21 July 1915	Generalleutnant	Max Hoffmann
23 September 1916	General der Kavallerie	Manfred von Richthofen
3 August 1918	Generalleutnant	Arthur Freiherr von Lüttwitz

== See also ==
- German Army order of battle, Western Front (1918)

== Bibliography ==
- Cron, Hermann (2002). Imperial German Army 1914-18: Organisation, Structure, Orders-of-Battle [first published: 1937]. Helion & Co. ISBN 1-874622-70-1.
- Ellis, John; Cox, Michael (1993). The World War I Databook. Aurum Press Ltd. ISBN 1-85410-766-6.
- Busche, Hartwig (1998). Formationsgeschichte der Deutschen Infanterie im Ersten Weltkrieg (1914 bis 1918) (in German). Institut für Preußische Historiographie.
- Histories of Two Hundred and Fifty-One Divisions of the German Army which Participated in the War (1914-1918), compiled from records of Intelligence section of the General Staff, American Expeditionary Forces, at General Headquarters, Chaumont, France 1919. The London Stamp Exchange Ltd. 1989 [1920]. ISBN 0-948130-87-3.
- The German Forces in the Field; 7th Revision, 11th November 1918; Compiled by the General Staff, War Office. Imperial War Museum, London and the Battery Press. 1995 [1918]. ISBN 978-1-870423-95-3.
