= 7th Cavalry Division (German Empire) =

7th Cavalry Division (7. Kavallerie-Division)
- Flag of the Staff of a Division (1871 – 1918)
- Active: 2 August 1914 – 1919
- Disbanded: 1919
- Country: German Empire
- Branch: Army
- Type: Cavalry
- Size: Approximately 5,000 (on mobilisation)
- Engagements: World War I

The 7th Cavalry Division (7. Kavallerie-Division) was a unit of the German Army in World War I. The division was formed on the mobilization of the German Army in August 1914. The division was disbanded in 1919 during the demobilization of the German Army after World War I.

== Combat chronicle ==
It was initially assigned to III Cavalry Corps, which preceded 6th Army's advance on the Western Front. In October 1915, it was engaged in occupation duties in Belgium until October 1916, when it relocated to Romania. In January 1917, the division returned to the Western Front and was in Alsace until May 1918, Flanders until August 1918, Artois to October 1918 and back to Flanders until the end of the war. It was dismounted on 14 May 1918 and restructured to form the 7th Cavalry Schützen Division. By the end of the war, it was serving under 64th Corps (z.b.V.), Armee-Abteilung B, Heeresgruppe Herzog Albrecht von Württemberg on the Western Front.

A more detailed combat chronicle can be found at the German-language version of this article.

== Order of Battle on mobilisation ==
On formation, in August 1914, the component units of the division were:

- 26th Cavalry Brigade (from XIII Army Corps District)
  - 25th (1st Württemberg) Dragoons "Queen Olga"
  - 26th (2nd Württemberg) Dragoons "King"
- 30th Cavalry Brigade (from XV Corps District)
  - 15th (3rd Silesian) Dragoons Nr. 15
  - 9th (2nd Rhenish) Hussars
- 42nd Cavalry Brigade (from XXI Army Corps District)
  - 11th (2nd Brandenburg) Uhlans "Count Haeseler"
  - 15th (Schleswig-Holstein) Uhlans
- Horse Artillery Abteilung of the 15th (1st Upper Alsatian) Field Artillery Regiment
- 3rd Machine Gun Detachment
- Pioneer Detachment
- Signals Detachment
  - Heavy Wireless Station 26
  - Light Wireless Station 13
  - Light Wireless Station 15
- Cavalry Motorised Vehicle Column 7

See: Table of Organisation and Equipment

== 7th Cavalry Schützen Division ==
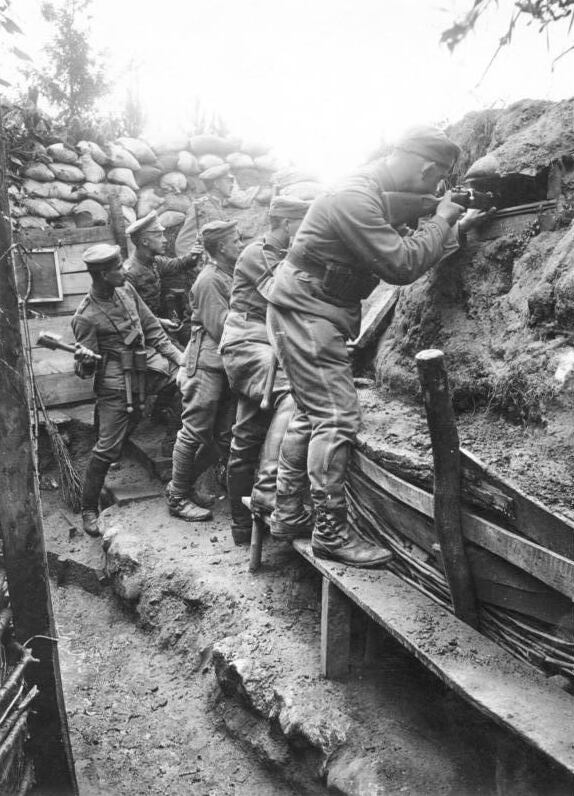
German cavalry of the 11th Reserve Hussar Regiment in a trench in France in 1916

The 7th Cavalry Division was extensively reorganised in the course of the war, culminating in its conversion to a Cavalry Schützen Division, that is to say, dismounted cavalry. Here, the cavalry brigades were renamed Cavalry Schützen Commands and performed a similar role to that of an infantry regiment command. Likewise, the cavalry regiments became Cavalry Schützen Regiments and allocated the role of an infantry battalion (and their squadrons acted as infantry companies). However, these units were much weaker than normal infantry formations (for example, a Schützen squadron had a strength of just 4 officers and 109 NCOs and other ranks, considerably less than that of an infantry company).

- 26th Cavalry Brigade became independent on 6 October 1917
- 30th Cavalry Brigade renamed 30th Cavalry Schützen Command on 27 May 1918
- 42nd Cavalry Brigade became independent on 14 September 1916
- 28th Cavalry Brigade joined from 4th Cavalry Division on 17 May 1918 and renamed 28th Cavalry Schützen Command on 27 May 1918
- 41st Cavalry Brigade joined from 1st Cavalry Division on 17 October 1916 and renamed 41st Cavalry Schützen Command on 27 May 1918

== Late World War I organization ==
Allied Intelligence rated this division as 4th Class (of 4 classes). It's late war organisation was:

- 21st Landwehr Brigade
  - 28th Cavalry Schützen Command
    - 11th (2nd Brandenburg) Uhlans "Count Haeseler"
    - 15th (Schleswig-Holstein) Uhlans
    - 4th Reserve Uhlans
  - 30th Cavalry Schützen Command
    - 15th (3rd Silesian) Dragoons
    - 25th (1st Württemberg) Dragoons "Queen Olga"
    - 9th (2nd Rhenish) Hussars
  - 41st Cavalry Schützen Command
    - 5th (West Prussian) Cuirassiers "Duke Frederick Eugene of Württemberg"
    - 26th (2nd Württemberg) Dragoons "King"
    - 4th (1st Pomeranian) Uhlans "von Schmidt"
- 2nd Squadron, 6th (Brandenburg) Cuirassiers "Emperor Nicholas I of Russia" (mounted cavalry)
- Artillery Command
  - Horse Artillery Abteilung of the 1st Guards Field Artillery Regiment
  - 351st Light Ammunition Column
  - 717th Light Ammunition Column
- 485th Pioneer Battalion
  - 2nd Company, 19th Pioneer Battalion
  - 3rd Company, 19th Pioneer Battalion
  - 2nd Reserve Company, II Pioneer Battalion No. 16
  - 3rd Cavalry Pioneer Abteilung
  - 6th Cavalry Pioneer Abteilung
- Signal Command
  - Telephone Detachment
  - 186th Wireless Detachment
- Medical and Veterinary
  - 34th Ambulance Company
  - 142nd Field Hospital
  - 141st Vet. Hospital
- Train
  - 783rd Motor Transport Column
- Heavy Artillery
  - 117th Foot Artillery Battalion

== See also ==
- German Army (German Empire)
- German cavalry in World War I
- German Army order of battle (1914)

== Bibliography ==
- Cron, Hermann (2002). Imperial German Army 1914-18: Organisation, Structure, Orders-of-Battle [first published: 1937]. Helion & Co. ISBN 1-874622-70-1.
- Ellis, John; Cox, Michael (1993). The World War I Databook. Aurum Press Ltd. ISBN 1-85410-766-6.
- Histories of Two Hundred and Fifty-One Divisions of the German Army which Participated in the War (1914-1918), compiled from records of Intelligence section of the General Staff, American Expeditionary Forces, at General Headquarters, Chaumont, France 1919. The London Stamp Exchange Ltd. 1989 [1920]. ISBN 0-948130-87-3.
- The German Forces in the Field; 7th Revision, 11th November 1918; Compiled by the General Staff, War Office. Imperial War Museum, London and the Battery Press. 1995 [1918]. ISBN 978-1-870423-95-3.
