= 87th (1st Nassau) Infantry =

87th (1st Nassau) Infantry Regiment
- Active: March 1809 - 1918
- Country: German Empire
- Allegiance: Duchy of Nassau; Kingdom of Prussia
- Branch: Infantry
- Type: Regiment
- Garrison/HQ: Mainz
- Engagements: Napoleonic Wars; World War I

The 87th (1st Nassau) Infantry Regiment (German: 1. Nassauisches Infanterie-Regiment Nr. 87) was an infantry regiment, part of the 41st Infantry Brigade and the 21st Division. The unit was created in the year 1809, and they were garrisoned in the city of Mainz.

The 87th infantry regiment also had very distinctive uniforms, since unlike their German and Dutch counterparts the Nassau regiment was equipped with dark green uniforms and yellow baldric's on both shoulders whereas the officers wore dark green uniforms and a white baldric on the right shoulder.

During the Franco-Prussian War of 1870-71 the 87th Infantry Regiment formed part of Colonel Hermann von Koblinski's 41st Infantry Brigade in the 21st Infantry Division of the XI Army Corps. As this point they wore standard Prussian blue uniforms with red shoulder straps and yellow cuff flap piping.

== See also ==
- List of Imperial German infantry regiments
