= 67th Corps (German Empire) =

67th Corps (Generalkommando zbV 67)
- Flag of the Staff of a Generalkommando (1871–1918)
- Active: 17 September 1917-1919
- Disbanded: 1919
- Country: German Empire
- Branch: Army
- Engagements: World War I

Insignia
- Abbreviation: Genkdo zbV 67

The 67th Corps (German: Generalkommando zbV 67) was a corps formation of the German Army in World War I. It was formed on 17 September 1917 and was still in existence at the end of the war.

== Chronicle ==
The 67th Corps (z.b.V.) was formed on 17 September 1917.

With the onset of trench warfare, the German Army recognised that it was no longer possible to maintain the traditional Corps unit, that is, one made up of two divisions. Whereas at some times (and in some places) a Corps of two divisions was sufficient, at other times 5 or 6 divisions were necessary. Therefore, under the Hindenburg regime (from summer 1916), new Corps headquarters were created without organic divisions. These new Corps were designated General Commands for Special Use (German: Generalkommandos zur besonderen Verwendung).

67th Corps was still in existence at the end of the war.

== Commanders ==
The 67th Corps was commanded throughout its existence by General der Infanterie Reinhard von Scheffer-Boyadel.

== See also ==
- German Army (German Empire)

== Bibliography ==
- Cron, Hermann (2002). Imperial German Army 1914-18: Organisation, Structure, Orders-of-Battle [first published: 1937]. Helion & Co. ISBN 1-874622-70-1.
