= XXVII Reserve Corps =

WWI army unit

XXVII Reserve Corps XXVII. Reserve-Korps
- Flag of the Staff of a Generalkommando (1871–1918)
- Active: October 1914 - February 1919
- Country: German Empire
- Type: Corps
- Size: Approximately 32,000 (on formation)
- Engagements: World War I Western Front First Battle of Ypres Second Battle of Ypres Second Battle of Champagne Battle of the Somme Spring Offensive Eastern Front Kerensky offensive

The XXVII Reserve Corps (German: XXVII. Reserve-Korps / XXVII RK) was a corps-level command of the German army during World War I.

== Formation ==
XXVII Reserve Corps was formed in October 1914. It was part of the first wave of new Corps formed at the outset of World War I consisting of XXII - XXVII Reserve Corps of 43rd - 54th Reserve Divisions (plus 6th Bavarian Reserve Division). The personnel was predominantly made up of kriegsfreiwillige (wartime volunteers) who did not wait to be called up. It was still in existence at the end of the war.

=== Structure on formation ===
On formation in October 1914, XXVII Reserve Corps consisted of two divisions. but was weaker than an Active Corps

- Reserve Infantry Regiments consisted of three battalions but only had a machine gun platoon (of 2 machine guns) rather than a machine gun company (of 6 machine guns)
- Reserve Jäger Battalions did not have a machine gun company on formation, though some were provided with a machine gun platoon
- Reserve Cavalry Detachments were much smaller than the Reserve Cavalry Regiments formed on mobilisation
- Reserve Field Artillery Regiments consisted of three abteilungen (2 gun and 1 howitzer) of three batteries each, but each battery had just 4 guns (rather than 6 of the Active and the Reserve Regiments formed on mobilisation)

In summary, XXVII Reserve Corps mobilised with 26 infantry battalions, 10 machine gun platoons (20 machine guns), 2 cavalry detachments, 18 field artillery batteries (72 guns) and 2 pioneer companies.

Corps	Division	Brigade	Units
XXVII Reserve Corps	53rd Reserve Division	105th Reserve Infantry Brigade	241st Reserve Infantry Regiment
XXVII Reserve Corps	53rd Reserve Division	105th Reserve Infantry Brigade	242nd Reserve Infantry Regiment
XXVII Reserve Corps	53rd Reserve Division	106th Reserve Infantry Brigade	243rd Reserve Infantry Regiment
XXVII Reserve Corps	53rd Reserve Division	106th Reserve Infantry Brigade	244th Reserve Infantry Regiment
XXVII Reserve Corps	53rd Reserve Division		25th Reserve Jäger Battalion
XXVII Reserve Corps	53rd Reserve Division		53rd Reserve Field Artillery Regiment
XXVII Reserve Corps	53rd Reserve Division		53rd Reserve Cavalry Detachment
XXVII Reserve Corps	53rd Reserve Division		53rd Reserve Pioneer Company
XXVII Reserve Corps	54th Reserve Division	107th Reserve Infantry Brigade	245th Reserve Infantry Regiment
XXVII Reserve Corps	54th Reserve Division	107th Reserve Infantry Brigade	246th Reserve Infantry Regiment
XXVII Reserve Corps	54th Reserve Division	108th Reserve Infantry Brigade	247th Reserve Infantry Regiment
XXVII Reserve Corps	54th Reserve Division	108th Reserve Infantry Brigade	248th Reserve Infantry Regiment
XXVII Reserve Corps	54th Reserve Division		26th Reserve Jäger Battalion
XXVII Reserve Corps	54th Reserve Division		54th Reserve Field Artillery Regiment
XXVII Reserve Corps	54th Reserve Division		54th Reserve Cavalry Detachment
XXVII Reserve Corps	54th Reserve Division		54th Reserve Pioneer Company

== Combat chronicle ==
Formed of Saxon and Württemberg units in the early stages of the First World War, the Corps appeared on the Western Front in Belgium in October 1914. It was assigned to the 4th Army, commanded by Generalfeldmarschall Albrecht, Duke of Württemberg, with which it participated in the First Battle of Ypres. In 1915, it took part in the Second Battle of Ypres and the Second Battle of Champagne and in 1916 in the Battle of the Somme.

In November 1916, it was transferred to the Eastern Front. In late 1917 it returned to the West, initially on border security duties on the Dutch-Belgian border, before returning to the Flanders front in January 1918. It took part in the German spring offensive from March 1918 and continued to be engaged on the Western Front for the remainder of the War.

The Corps was dissolved in February 1919.

== Commanders ==
XXVII Reserve Corps had the following commanders during its existence:

From	Rank	Name
25 August 1914	Generalleutnant	Adolph von Carlowitz
27 October 1914	General der Artillerie	Richard von Schubert
28 August 1916	General der Infanterie	Oskar von Ehrenthal
15 June 1917	General der Kavallerie	Hans Krug von Nidda
8 September 1917	Generalleutnant	Bernhard von Watzdorf

== Bibliography ==
- Cron, Hermann (2002). Imperial German Army 1914-18: Organisation, Structure, Orders-of-Battle [first published: 1937]. Helion & Co. ISBN 1-874622-70-1.
- Ellis, John; Cox, Michael (1993). The World War I Databook. Aurum Press Ltd. ISBN 1-85410-766-6.
- Busche, Hartwig (1998). Formationsgeschichte der Deutschen Infanterie im Ersten Weltkrieg (1914 bis 1918) (in German). Institut für Preußische Historiographie.
- Histories of Two Hundred and Fifty-One Divisions of the German Army which Participated in the War (1914-1918), compiled from records of Intelligence section of the General Staff, American Expeditionary Forces, at General Headquarters, Chaumont, France 1919. The London Stamp Exchange Ltd. 1989 [1920]. ISBN 0-948130-87-3.
- The German Forces in the Field; 7th Revision, 11th November 1918; Compiled by the General Staff, War Office. Imperial War Museum, London and the Battery Press. 1995 [1918]. ISBN 978-1-870423-95-3.
