= XXV Reserve Corps =

XXV Reserve Corps XXV. Reserve-Korps
- Flag of the Staff of a Generalkommando (1871–1918)
- Active: October 1914 - post November 1918
- Country: German Empire
- Branch: Imperial German Army
- Type: Corps
- Size: Approximately 32,000 (on formation)
- Engagements: World War I

Insignia
- Abbreviation: XXV RK

The XXV Reserve Corps (German: XXV. Reserve-Korps / XXV RK) was a corps level command of the German Army in World War I.

== Formation ==
XXV Reserve Corps was formed in October 1914. It was part of the first wave of new reserve units formed at the outset of World War I; consisting of XXII to XXVII Reserve Corps and 43rd to 54th Reserve Divisions (plus the 6th Bavarian Reserve Division). The personnel was predominantly made up of Kriegsfreiwillige (wartime volunteers) who enlisted instead of being conscripted. It was still in existence at the end of the war in the 3rd Army, part of the Army Group German Crown Prince on the Western Front.

=== Structure on formation ===
On formation in October 1914, XXV Reserve Corps consisted of two divisions, thus weaker than a regular Army Corps:

- Reserve Infantry regiments consisted of three battalions but only had a machine gun platoon (of 2 machine guns) rather than a machine gun company (of 6 machine guns).
- Reserve Jäger battalions did not have a machine gun company on formation, though some were provided with a machine gun platoon.
- Reserve Cavalry detachments were much smaller than the Reserve Cavalry regiments formed on mobilisation.
- Reserve Field Artillery regiments consisted of three abteilungen (2 gun and 1 howitzer) of three batteries each, but each battery had just 4 guns (rather than 6 like the regular or older reserve regiments).

In summary, XXV Reserve Corps mobilised with 26 infantry battalions, 10 machine gun platoons (20 machine guns), 2 cavalry detachments, 18 field artillery batteries (72 guns) and 2 pioneer companies.

Corps	Division	Brigade	Units
XXV Reserve Corps	49th Reserve Division	97th Reserve Infantry Brigade	225th Reserve Infantry Regiment
XXV Reserve Corps	49th Reserve Division	97th Reserve Infantry Brigade	226th Reserve Infantry Regiment
XXV Reserve Corps	49th Reserve Division	98th Reserve Infantry Brigade	227th Reserve Infantry Regiment
XXV Reserve Corps	49th Reserve Division	98th Reserve Infantry Brigade	228th Reserve Infantry Regiment
XXV Reserve Corps	49th Reserve Division		21st Reserve Jäger Battalion
XXV Reserve Corps	49th Reserve Division		49th Reserve Field Artillery Regiment
XXV Reserve Corps	49th Reserve Division		49th Reserve Cavalry Detachment
XXV Reserve Corps	49th Reserve Division		49th Reserve Pioneer Company
XXV Reserve Corps	50th Reserve Division	99th Reserve Infantry Brigade	229th Reserve Infantry Regiment
XXV Reserve Corps	50th Reserve Division	99th Reserve Infantry Brigade	230th Reserve Infantry Regiment
XXV Reserve Corps	50th Reserve Division	100th Reserve Infantry Brigade	231st Reserve Infantry Regiment
XXV Reserve Corps	50th Reserve Division	100th Reserve Infantry Brigade	232nd Reserve Infantry Regiment
XXV Reserve Corps	50th Reserve Division		22nd Reserve Jäger Battalion
XXV Reserve Corps	50th Reserve Division		50th Reserve Field Artillery Regiment
XXV Reserve Corps	50th Reserve Division		50th Reserve Cavalry Detachment
XXV Reserve Corps	50th Reserve Division		50th Reserve Pioneer Company

== Commanders ==
XXV Reserve Corps had the following commanders during its existence:

From	Rank	Name
25 August 1914	General der Infanterie	Reinhard von Scheffer-Boyadel
3 September 1916	Generalleutnant	Karl Suren
18 November 1916	Generalleutnant	Manfred von Richthofen
8 March 1917	Generalleutnant	Konstanz von Heineccius
23 November 1917	General der Infanterie	Horst Edler von der Planitz
20 December 1917	Generalleutnant	Wilhelm Groener
25 February 1918	General der Infanterie	Arnold von Winckler

== See also ==
- German Army order of battle, Western Front (1918)

== Bibliography ==
- Cron, Hermann (2002). Imperial German Army 1914-18: Organisation, Structure, Orders-of-Battle [first published: 1937]. Helion & Co. ISBN 1-874622-70-1.
- Ellis, John; Cox, Michael (1993). The World War I Databook. Aurum Press Ltd. ISBN 1-85410-766-6.
- Busche, Hartwig (1998). Formationsgeschichte der Deutschen Infanterie im Ersten Weltkrieg (1914 bis 1918) (in German). Institut für Preußische Historiographie.
- Histories of Two Hundred and Fifty-One Divisions of the German Army which Participated in the War (1914-1918), compiled from records of Intelligence section of the General Staff, American Expeditionary Forces, at General Headquarters, Chaumont, France 1919. The London Stamp Exchange Ltd. 1989 [1920]. ISBN 0-948130-87-3.
- The German Forces in the Field; 7th Revision, 11th November 1918; Compiled by the General Staff, War Office. Imperial War Museum, London and the Battery Press. 1995 [1918]. ISBN 978-1-870423-95-3.
