= XVII Reserve Corps =

XVII Reserve Corps XVII. Reserve-Korps
- Flag of the Staff of a Generalkommando (1871–1918)
- Active: October 1914 – 17 September 1917
- Country: German Empire
- Type: Corps
- Engagements: World War I

Insignia
- Abbreviation: XVII RK

The XVII Reserve Corps / XVII RK (German: XVII. Reserve-Korps) was a corps level command of the German Army in World War I.

== History ==
The Corps was formed in October 1914 as the temporary Corps Graudenz or Corps Zastrow named for its commander General der Infanterie Ernst von Zastrow, military governor of Graudenz. On 21 July 1915 it was established as XVII Reserve Corps. The Corps was dissolved on 17 September 1917.

The nucleus of the corps was troops collected at Graudenz Fortress. In mid-November 1914 it consisted of two divisions: Wernitz and Breugel with a strength of 26 battalions, 6 squadrons and 13 batteries.

On February 8, 1915 Zastrow Korps was organized as follows:

Corps	Division	Brigade	Units
Zastrow Corps; Graudenz Corps	Wernitz Division	Ersatz Brigade Grossmann	Ersatz Regiment Reinhardt
Zastrow Corps; Graudenz Corps	Wernitz Division	Ersatz Brigade Grossmann	Ersatz Regiment Wetzel (2 Btl.)
Zastrow Corps; Graudenz Corps	Wernitz Division	Ersatz Brigade Grossmann	Festungs MG Abteilung 9
Zastrow Corps; Graudenz Corps	Wernitz Division	Ersatz Brigade Grossmann	Festungs MG Abteilung 8
Zastrow Corps; Graudenz Corps	Wernitz Division	Ersatz Brigade Windheim	Ersatz Regiment Hoebel
Zastrow Corps; Graudenz Corps	Wernitz Division	Ersatz Brigade Windheim	Ersatz Regiment Groppe
Zastrow Corps; Graudenz Corps	Wernitz Division	Ersatz Brigade Windheim	Festungs MG Abteilung 3
Zastrow Corps; Graudenz Corps	Wernitz Division	Ersatz Brigade Windheim	1st Ersatz MG Komp des XX AK
Zastrow Corps; Graudenz Corps	Wernitz Division	Divisional Units	Bicycle Company Culm
Zastrow Corps; Graudenz Corps	Wernitz Division	Divisional Units	Mounted Rgt Cleinow
Zastrow Corps; Graudenz Corps	Wernitz Division	Divisional Units	2d Ersatz Battery/3d Guard Field Artillery Rgt 1
Zastrow Corps; Graudenz Corps	Wernitz Division	Divisional Units	1st Ersatz Battery/ Field Artillery Rgt 71
Zastrow Corps; Graudenz Corps	Wernitz Division	Divisional Units	Field Artillery Ersatz Abt 72
Zastrow Corps; Graudenz Corps	Wernitz Division	Divisional Units	1st Ersatz Battery/ Field Artillery Rgt 79
Zastrow Corps; Graudenz Corps	Wernitz Division	Divisional Units	Ist Battalion/Res Foot Artillery Rgt 17 (Heavy Field Howitzers)
Zastrow Corps; Graudenz Corps	Wernitz Division	Divisional Units	2d Ersatz battery/Foot Artillery Rgt 17 (10-Cm Cannon)
Zastrow Corps; Graudenz Corps	Wernitz Division	Divisional Units	3d Ersatz Co./Pioneer Battalion 26
Zastrow Corps; Graudenz Corps	Wernitz Division	Divisional Units	2d Landwehr Pioneer Co., III AK
Zastrow Corps; Graudenz Corps	Breugel Division	Brigade Falkenhayn	Landwehr Infantry Rgt 61
Zastrow Corps; Graudenz Corps	Breugel Division	Brigade Falkenhayn	Landwehr Infantry Rgt 99
Zastrow Corps; Graudenz Corps	Breugel Division	Brigade Falkenhayn	Ersatz Battalion/ Landwehr Infantry Rgt 5
Zastrow Corps; Graudenz Corps	Breugel Division	Brigade Falkenhayn	Festungs MG Abt 1
Zastrow Corps; Graudenz Corps	Breugel Division	Brigade Falkenhayn	Festungs MG Abt 4
Zastrow Corps; Graudenz Corps	Breugel Division	Brigade Pfafferot	Landwehr Infantry Rgt 17
Zastrow Corps; Graudenz Corps	Breugel Division	Brigade Pfafferot	Landwehr Infantry Regiment 21
Zastrow Corps; Graudenz Corps	Breugel Division	Brigade Pfafferot	Ersatz Battalion/ Landwehr Infantry Rgt Culm
Zastrow Corps; Graudenz Corps	Breugel Division	Brigade Pfafferot	Festungs MG Abt 7
Zastrow Corps; Graudenz Corps	Breugel Division	Brigade Pfafferot	Festungs MG Abt v. Stulpnagel
Zastrow Corps; Graudenz Corps	Breugel Division	Brigade Pfafferot	Ersatz Festungs MG Abt 2
Zastrow Corps; Graudenz Corps	Breugel Division	Divisional Units	Bicycle Co. Marienberg
Zastrow Corps; Graudenz Corps	Breugel Division	Divisional Units	½ Bicycle Co. Graudenz
Zastrow Corps; Graudenz Corps	Breugel Division	Divisional Units	1st & 2d mob Ersatz Sqs, XVII AK
Zastrow Corps; Graudenz Corps	Breugel Division	Divisional Units	2d Ersatz Battery/Field Artillery Rgt 36
Zastrow Corps; Graudenz Corps	Breugel Division	Divisional Units	2d Ersatz Battery/Field Artillery Rgt 73
Zastrow Corps; Graudenz Corps	Breugel Division	Divisional Units	2d Ersatz Battery/Field Artillery Rgt 79
Zastrow Corps; Graudenz Corps	Breugel Division	Divisional Units	5th Battery/Foot Artillery Rgt 15 (Heavy Field Howitzers)
Zastrow Corps; Graudenz Corps	Breugel Division	Divisional Units	¾ Ist Battalion/2d Guard Landwehr Foot Artillery Rgt (Heavy Field Howitzers)
Zastrow Corps; Graudenz Corps	Breugel Division	Divisional Units	7th Battery/Foot Artillery Rgt 15 (10-Cm Cannon)
Zastrow Corps; Graudenz Corps	Breugel Division	Divisional Units	4th Co./ Pioneer Btl 26
Zastrow Corps; Graudenz Corps	Breugel Division	Divisional Units	1st Reserve Co./Pioneer Btl 26

== Commanders ==
Corps Zastrow / XVII Reserve Corps had the following commanders during its existence:

From	Rank	Name
12 September 1914	General der Infanterie	Ernst von Zastrow
25 September 1915	Generalleutnant	Karl Suren
3 September 1916	General der Infanterie	Reinhard von Scheffer-Boyadel

== See also ==
- XVII Corps (German Empire)

== Bibliography ==
- Cron, Hermann (2002). Imperial German Army 1914-18: Organisation, Structure, Orders-of-Battle [first published: 1937]. Helion & Co. ISBN 1-874622-70-1.
- Ellis, John; Cox, Michael (1993). The World War I Databook. Aurum Press Ltd. ISBN 1-85410-766-6.
- Histories of Two Hundred and Fifty-One Divisions of the German Army which Participated in the War (1914-1918), compiled from records of Intelligence section of the General Staff, American Expeditionary Forces, at General Headquarters, Chaumont, France 1919. The London Stamp Exchange Ltd. 1989 [1920]. ISBN 0-948130-87-3.
- The German Forces in the Field; 7th Revision, 11th November 1918; Compiled by the General Staff, War Office. Imperial War Museum, London and the Battery Press. 1995 [1918]. ISBN 978-1-870423-95-3.
- Der Weltkrieg 1914 Bis 1918. Berlin: Mittler. 1929.
