= 75th Reserve Division =

75th Reserve Division (75. Reserve-Division)
- Active: 1914-1919
- Country: Germany
- Branch: Army
- Type: Infantry
- Size: Approx. 12,500
- Engagements: World War I: Second Battle of the Masurian Lakes, Kerensky Offensive, Battle of Riga, German spring offensive, Third Battle of the Aisne, Meuse-Argonne Offensive

The 75th Reserve Division (75. Reserve-Division) was a unit of the Imperial German Army in World War I. The division was formed at the end of December 1914 and organized over the next month, arriving in the line in early February 1915. It was part of the second large wave of new divisions formed at the outset of World War I, which were numbered the 75th through 82nd Reserve Divisions. The division was initially part of XXXVIII Reserve Corps. The division was disbanded in 1919 during the demobilization of the German Army after World War I. The division was primarily raised in the XIV Corps area (Grand Duchy of Baden) and the XI Corps area (Hesse-Kassel or Hesse-Cassel, Waldeck and the Thuringian states).

== Combat chronicle ==
The 75th Reserve Division initially fought on the Eastern Front. Its baptism of fire was in the Second Battle of the Masurian Lakes. It fought along the Narew in July and August 1915 and participated in the conquest of Grodno and the Battle of Vilnius. From October 1915 to August 1916, the division remained in positional warfare and then fought at Kovel. Afterwards, it returned to the trenchlines until late June 1917. The division then fought against the Russian Kerensky Offensive and was part of Oskar von Hutier's Eighth Army in the Battle of Riga in September 1917. In December 1917, the division was transferred to the Western Front and went into the line north of the Ailette, above the Chemin des Dames. It participated in the 1918 German spring offensive, fighting in the Third Battle of the Aisne. It then occupied various parts of the line and fought against the various Allied counteroffensives, ending the war fighting against the Meuse-Argonne Offensive. Allied intelligence rated the division as third class.

== Order of battle on formation ==
The 75th Reserve Division, like the other divisions of its wave and unlike prior German divisions, was organized from the outset as a triangular division. The order of battle of the 75th Reserve Division on December 29, 1914, was as follows:

- 75.Reserve-Infanterie-Brigade
  - Reserve-Infanterie-Regiment Nr. 249
  - Reserve-Infanterie-Regiment Nr. 250
  - Reserve-Infanterie-Regiment Nr. 251
  - Reserve-Radfahrer-Kompanie Nr. 75
- Reserve-Kavallerie-Abteilung Nr. 75
- 75.Reserve-Feldartillerie-Brigade
  - Reserve-Feldartillerie-Regiment Nr. 55
  - Reserve-Feldartillerie-Regiment Nr. 57
- Reserve-Pionier-Kompanie Nr. 75

== Order of battle on January 1, 1918 ==
The most significant wartime structural change in the divisions of this wave was the reduction from two field artillery regiments to one. Over the course of the war, other changes took place, including the formation of artillery and signals commands and the enlargement of combat engineer support to a full pioneer battalion. The order of battle on January 1, 1918, was as follows:

- 75.Reserve-Infanterie-Brigade
  - Reserve-Infanterie-Regiment Nr. 249
  - Reserve-Infanterie-Regiment Nr. 250
  - Reserve-Infanterie-Regiment Nr. 251
- 3.Eskadron/Garde-Dragoner-Regiment Nr. 2
- Artillerie-Kommandeur 75
  - Reserve-Feldartillerie-Regiment Nr. 55
  - Fußartillerie-Bataillon Nr. 82 (from May 2, 1918)
- Pionier-Bataillon Nr. 375
  - Reserve-Pionier-Kompanie Nr. 75
  - Pionier-Kompanie Nr. 384
  - Minenwerfer-Kompanie Nr. 275
- Divisions-Nachrichten-Kommandeur 475
