= 9th Landwehr Division =

9th Landwehr Division (9. Landwehr-Division)
- Active: 1914-1919
- Country: German Empire
- Branch: Army
- Type: Infantry
- Size: Approx. 15,000
- Engagements: World War I: Second Battle of Champagne, Battle of Verdun, Second Battle of the Marne, Meuse-Argonne Offensive

The 9th Landwehr Division (9. Landwehr-Division) was a unit of the Imperial German Army in World War I. The division was formed in January 1915 as the Mühlenfels Division (Division Mühlenfels), named after its commander, and became the 9th Landwehr Division on February 14, 1915. The division was disbanded in 1919 during the demobilization of the German Army after World War I.

== Combat chronicle ==
The 9th Landwehr Division served on the Western Front, holding a sector in the Argonne Forest. From September to November 1915, it saw action in the Second Battle of Champagne. From July to September 1916, it was involved in the Battle of Verdun. It was peripherally involved in the Second Battle of the Marne in July 1918. Late in 1918, it faced the Allied Meuse-Argonne Offensive. Allied intelligence rated the division as fourth class; it was considered primarily a sector holding division and not an offensive formation but "on the defensive it showed some fighting ability.

== Order of battle on formation ==
The 9th Landwehr Division was formed as a square division from previously independent Landwehr brigades. The order of battle of the division on February 15, 1915, was as follows:

- 49. Landwehr-Infanterie-Brigade
  - Landwehr-Infanterie-Regiment Nr. 56
  - Großherzoglich Hessisches Landwehr-Infanterie-Regiment Nr. 118
  - Maschinengewehr-Zug Nr. 77
  - Maschinengewehr-Zug Nr. 97
- 43. Landwehr-Infanterie-Brigade (from March 4, 1915, 76.Landwehr-Infanterie-Brigade)
  - Reserve-Infanterie-Regiment Nr. 79
  - Landwehr-Infanterie-Regiment Nr. 83
  - Maschinengewehr-Zug Nr. 62
  - Maschinengewehr-Zug Nr. 81
- Landwehr-Kavallerie-Regiment Nr. 9
- 4. Lothringisches Feldartillerie-Regiment Nr. 70 (until June 3, 1916)
- II. Abteilung/Feldartillerie-Regiment von Puecker (1. Schlesisches) Nr. 6 (until June 3, 1916)
- 8. Batterie/Fußartillerie-Regiment von Dieskau (Niederschlesisches) Nr. 6 (until June 3, 1916)
- Landwehr-Feldartillerie-Regiment Nr. 9 (from June 3, 1916)
- 1. Kompanie/Schlesisches Pionier-Bataillon Nr. 6

== Late-war order of battle ==
The division underwent a number of organizational changes over the course of the war. It was triangularized in February 1917. Cavalry was reduced, artillery and signals commands were formed, and combat engineer support was expanded to a full battalion. The order of battle on August 10, 1918, was as follows:

- 76. Landwehr-Infanterie-Brigade
  - Landwehr-Infanterie-Regiment Nr. 83
  - Großherzoglich Hessisches Landwehr-Infanterie-Regiment Nr. 116
  - Großherzoglich Hessisches Landwehr-Infanterie-Regiment Nr. 118
- 1. Eskadron/Dragoner-Regiment von Bredow (1. Schlesisches) Nr. 4
- Artillerie-Kommandeur 150
  - Landwehr-Feldartillerie-Regiment Nr. 9
- Stab Pionier-Bataillon Nr. 409
  - 1. Landwehr-Pionier-Kompanie/XVIII. Armeekorps
  - 2. Landwehr-Pionier-Kompanie/X. Armeekorps
  - Minenwerfer-Kompanie Nr. 309
- Divisions-Nachrichten-Kommandeur 509
