= Christoph Rass =

German historian and professor (born 1969)

Christoph A. Rass
- Born: 1969 (age 56–57); Saarlouis, Germany
- Occupation: Historian
- Awards: Kalliope Prize (2017); LASA Best Article Award (2025)

Academic background
- Education: Saarland University; RWTH Aachen University

Academic work
- Discipline: History
- Sub-discipline: Migration studies, Modern History
- Institutions: Osnabrück University
- Main interests: Historical migration studies German military history
- Notable works: Germany and the Second World War

Christoph A. Rass (born 1969 in Saarlouis) is a German historian and professor of Modern History and Historical Migration Studies at Osnabrück University. His research focuses on migration history, the social history of organized violence, and conflict landscape studies.

== Education and career ==
Rass studied economic and social history, modern history, and information science at Saarland University in Saarbrücken from 1990 to 1996. He completed his doctorate at RWTH Aachen University in 2001 with a dissertation titled Menschenmaterial: Sozialprofil, Machtstrukturen und Handlungsmuster einer Infanteriedivision der Wehrmacht im Zweiten Weltkrieg (Human Material: Social Profile, Power Structures and Patterns of Action of a Wehrmacht Infantry Division in the Second World War). He completed his habilitation at RWTH Aachen University in 2007 with the work Institutionalisierungsprozesse auf einem internationalen Arbeitsmarkt: Bilaterale Wanderungsverträge in Europa zwischen 1919 und 1974 (Institutionalization Processes in an International Labor Market: Bilateral Migration Agreements in Europe, 1919–1974), published in 2010.

From 1996 to 2011, Rass worked at the Department of Economic and Social History at RWTH Aachen University, initially as a research associate (Wissenschaftlicher Mitarbeiter), then as Lecturer (Akademischer Rat) from 2001 following his doctorate, and as Senior Lecturer (Akademischer Oberrat) from 2007 following his habilitation.

Rass moved to Osnabrück University in 2011 as Acting Professor of Modern History. In 2015, he was appointed full professor (W3) of Modern History and Historical Migration Studies. Since 2011, he has been a member of the Institute for Migration Research and Intercultural Studies (IMIS), and since 2021 he has served on its board.

Since April 2024, Rass serves as Principal Investigator in the German Research Foundation (DFG)-funded Collaborative Research Centre (Sonderforschungsbereich) 1604 "Production of Migration" at Osnabrück University. The research center, which received €8.3 million for its first funding phase through 2027, is the first SFB in Germany dedicated to migration studies.

== Research ==
His research focuses on three main areas: historical migration studies, the social history of organized violence (particularly the Wehrmacht), and conflict landscape studies combining historical research with archaeological methods. He has been interviewed on military history and migration by German media, including the Neue Osnabrücker Zeitung.

=== German military history ===
His dissertation, published as Menschenmaterial (2003), is a social-historical study of an average Wehrmacht infantry division during the Eastern Front campaign. Based on 2,300 personnel files from the 253rd Infantry Division, the study was the first to comprehensively analyze the social structures, behavioral patterns, and conditions of everyday life in a typical Wehrmacht infantry division on the Eastern Front. Historian Christian Hartmann, reviewing the book for the Frankfurter Allgemeine Zeitung, praised it as "Grundlagenforschung im besten Sinne" (foundational research in the best sense). Johannes Klotz, writing in the Süddeutsche Zeitung, noted that the study definitively answered questions about Wehrmacht soldiers' participation in the war of annihilation.

=== History of German Federal Intelligence Service ===
As part of the Independent Historians Commission (Unabhängige Historikerkommission) for the History of the German Federal Intelligence Service (BND) 1945–1968, Rass authored Das Sozialprofil des Bundesnachrichtendienstes (The Social Profile of the German Federal Intelligence Service, 2016). Based on 3,650 biographical records from a random sample of all full-time BND employees, the study analyzed the social composition of the intelligence service and the extent of Nazi-era continuities in its personnel. It was the first volume of the commission's 15-volume publication series.

=== Migration studies ===
Rass has published extensively on European labor migration systems, the history of migration categories, and the conceptual history of migration terminology. His habilitation thesis examined bilateral migration agreements across eighteen European countries from 1919 to 1974, offering the first comparative long-term study of the "guest worker" system.

His 2024 article "Migrating Concepts: The Transatlantic Origins of the Bracero Program, 1919–1942," co-authored with Julie M. Weise (University of Oregon), was published in the American Historical Review and awarded the 2025 Best Article in Social Sciences prize by the Mexico Section of the Latin American Studies Association (LASA).

== Awards and honors ==
- 2017: Kalliope Prize for Practice-Oriented Migration Research, German Emigration Center Bremerhaven
- 2025: Best Article in Social Sciences, LASA Mexico Section (with Julie M. Weise)

== Selected publications ==
=== Monographs ===
- Menschenmaterial: Deutsche Soldaten an der Ostfront. Innenansichten einer Infanteriedivision 1939–1945 (Schöningh, 2003) ISBN 3-506-74486-0
- Institutionalisierungsprozesse auf einem internationalen Arbeitsmarkt. Bilaterale Wanderungsverträge in Europa zwischen 1919 und 1974 (Schöningh, 2010) ISBN 978-3-506-77068-4
- Das Sozialprofil des Bundesnachrichtendienstes: Von den Anfängen bis 1968 (Ch. Links Verlag, 2016) ISBN 978-3-86153-920-9

=== Edited volumes ===
- (editor) Militärische Migration vom Altertum bis zur Gegenwart (Schöningh, 2016) ISBN 978-3-506-78109-3
- (with Andreas Pott and Frank Wolff, eds.) Was ist ein Migrationsregime? What Is a Migration Regime? (Springer VS, 2018) ISBN 978-3-658-20531-7

=== Contributions ===
- Germany and the Second World War Vol. IX/I: German Wartime Society 1939–1945: Politicization, Disintegration, and the Struggle for Survival (2008), with Ralf Blank, Jörg Echternkamp, Karola Fings, Jürgen Förster, Winfried Heinemann, Tobias Jersak, Armin Nolzen
