= 49th Reserve Division (German Empire) =

49th Reserve Division (49. Reserve-Division)
- Active: 1914-1919
- Country: Germany
- Branch: Army
- Type: Infantry
- Engagements: World War I: Battle of Łódź (1914), Battle of Warsaw (1915), Battle of Arras (1917), Passchendaele, Battle of Cambrai (1917)

The 49th Reserve Division (49. Reserve-Division) was a unit of the Imperial German Army in World War I. The division was formed in September 1914 and organized over the next month, arriving in the line in mid-October. It was part of the first wave of new divisions formed at the outset of World War I, which were numbered the 43rd through 54th Reserve Divisions. The division was initially part of XXV Reserve Corps. The division was disbanded in 1919 during the demobilization of the German Army after World War I. The division was initially recruited in the V Army Corps area, which covered the Prussian Province of Posen and much of Lower Silesia in the Province of Silesia, and later received many replacements from the IV Army Corps area, which covered the Prussian Province of Saxony, the Duchy of Anhalt, and several of the Thuringian states.

== Combat chronicle ==
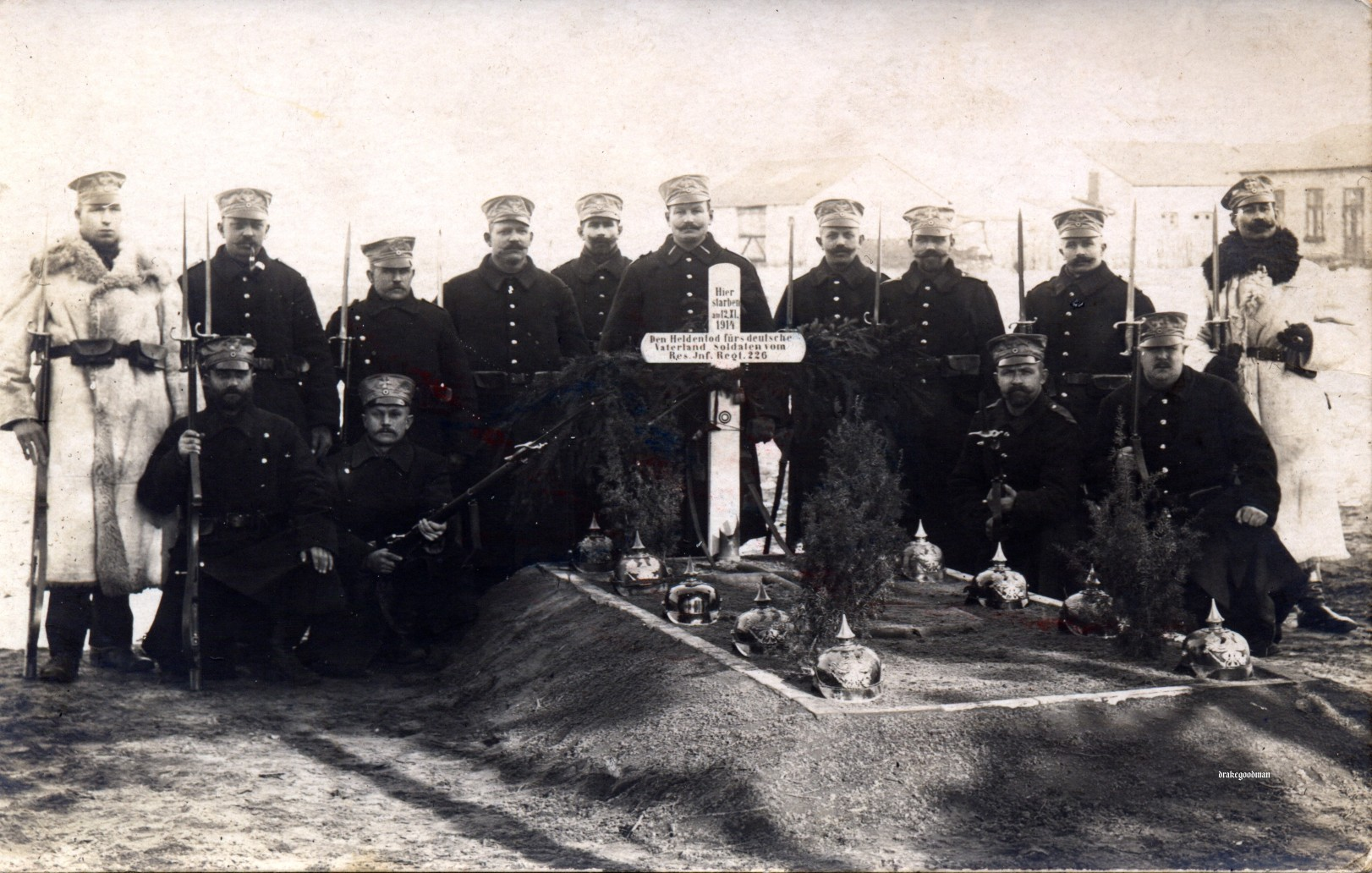
Reserve-Infanterie-Regiment Nr. 226, 12.11.1914

The 49th Reserve Division initially fought on the Eastern Front, entering the line in mid-October. It fought in the Battle of Łódź in November–December 1914 and then spent most of the period until mid-1915 fighting along the Rawka and Bzura Rivers. In July and August 1915 it fought in the Battle of Warsaw and then participated in the follow-on engagements as German forces drove the Russians back to a line along the Shchara and Servech Rivers. The division remained on the Shchara/Servech line until August 1916. The division then fought in various parts of the line, including in the Carpathians, until January 1917, when it was transferred to the Western Front. In 1917, it fought in the Battle of Arras, the Battle of Passchendaele, and the tank battle of Cambrai. It remained in the line in the Flanders region until the end of the war. In 1917, Allied intelligence assessed the division as a good division. In 1918 it was rated second class.

== Order of battle on formation ==
The 49th Reserve Division was initially organized as a square division, with essentially the same organization as the reserve divisions formed on mobilization. The order of battle of the 49th Reserve Division on September 10, 1914, was as follows:

- 97.Reserve-Infanterie-Brigade
  - Reserve-Infanterie-Regiment Nr. 225
  - Reserve-Infanterie-Regiment Nr. 226
  - Reserve-Jäger-Bataillon Nr. 21
- 98.Reserve-Infanterie -Brigade
  - Reserve-Infanterie-Regiment Nr. 227
  - Reserve-Infanterie-Regiment Nr. 228
- Reserve-Kavallerie-Abteilung Nr. 49
- Reserve-Feldartillerie-Regiment Nr. 49
- Reserve-Pionier-Kompanie Nr. 49

== Order of battle on August 22, 1918 ==
The 49th Reserve Division was triangularized in June 1915. Over the course of the war, other changes took place, including the formation of artillery and signals commands and the enlargement of combat engineer support to a full pioneer battalion. The order of battle on August 22, 1918, was as follows:

- 97.Reserve-Infanterie-Brigade
  - Reserve-Infanterie-Regiment Nr. 225
  - Reserve-Infanterie-Regiment Nr. 226
  - Reserve-Infanterie-Regiment Nr. 228
  - Maschinengewehr-Scharfschützen-Abteilung Nr. 59
- 2.Eskadron/Garde-Dragoner-Regiment Nr. 2
- Artillerie-Kommandeur 49
  - Reserve-Feldartillerie-Regiment Nr. 49
  - II.Bataillon/Fußartillerie-Regiment Nr. 49
- Pionier-Bataillon Nr. 349
- Divisions-Nachrichten-Kommandeur 449
