= 96th Infantry Division (German Empire) =

- Active: May 3rd, 1917–January 1919
- Country: Kingdom of Saxony; German Empire
- Branch: Imperial German Army
- Engagements: World War I: Eastern Front; Kerensky offensive; Western Front; Hundred Days Offensive

The 96th Infantry Division (96. Infanterie-Division) was a formation of the Imperial German Army in World War I.

== History ==
The 96th was formed on May 3, 1917, on the Eastern Front where it served there until February 1918 and was transferred to the Western Front where it fought in Lorraine and Vosges until the end of the war. Once the war ended, the division was sent back to Germany out of occupied territories where it was demobilized and disbanded in January 1919.

== Order of Battle in 1917-18 ==
- 177th Infantry Brigade
  - Replacement Infantry Regiment No. 40
  - Landwehr Infantry Regiment No. 102
  - Reserve Infantry Regiment No. 244
  - 4th Squadron / 1st Royal Saxon Hussar Regiment "King Albert" No. 18
- Artillery Commander No. 140
  - Reserve Field Regiment No. 53
- Engineer Battalion No. 96
- Division News Commander No. 96

== Command ==
The sole commander of the division was major general Friedrich von der Decken.
