= 6th Bavarian Landwehr Division =

Unit of the Imperial German Army from 1915 to 1919

6th Bavarian Landwehr Division (6. Bayerische Landwehr-Division)
- Active: 1915-1919
- Country: Bavaria/German Empire
- Branch: Army
- Type: Infantry
- Size: Approx. 15,000
- Engagements: World War I

The 6th Bavarian Landwehr Division (6. Bayerische Landwehr-Division) was a unit of the Bavarian Army, part of the Imperial German Army, in World War I. The division was formed on February 20, 1915. It was disbanded in 1919 during the demobilization of the German Army after World War I. It was composed primarily of troops of the Landwehr and the Landsturm from the 1st Bavarian Corps district.

== Combat chronicle ==
The 6th Bavarian Landwehr Division served on the Western Front, entering the line in Upper Alsace. It fought in the first and second battles of Münster in 1915 and remained in the line in Upper Alsace until the end of the war. Allied intelligence rated the division as fourth class, noting that it was only used in the calmest sectors of the front.

== Order of battle on formation ==
The 6th Bavarian Landwehr Division was formed as a square division with two brigades of two infantry regiments. The order of battle of the division on April 11, 1915, was as follows:

- 1. bayerische Landwehr-Infanterie-Brigade
  - Kgl. Bayerisches Landwehr-Infanterie-Regiment Nr. 1
  - Kgl. Bayerisches Landwehr-Infanterie-Regiment Nr. 2
- 2. bayerische Landwehr-Infanterie-Brigade
  - Kgl. Bayerisches Landwehr-Infanterie-Regiment Nr. 3
  - Kgl. Bayerisches Landwehr-Infanterie-Regiment Nr. 12
- 2. Landwehr-Eskadron/I. Bayerisches Armeekorps
- Kgl. Bayerische Landsturm-Feldartillerie-Abteilung Nr. 1
- 2.Batterie/Landwehr-Fußartillerie-Bataillon Nr. 20
- Kgl. Bayerische Landsturm-Pionier-Kompanie Nr. 1/II. Bayerisches Armeekorps

== Late-war order of battle ==
The division underwent several organizational changes over the course of the war. It was triangularized in December 1916. It received artillery and signals commands, and combat engineer support was expanded to a full pioneer battalion. The order of battle on February 28, 1918, was as follows:

- 1. bayerische Landwehr-Infanterie-Brigade
  - Kgl. Bayerisches Landwehr-Infanterie-Regiment Nr. 1
  - Kgl. Bayerisches Landwehr-Infanterie-Regiment Nr. 3
  - Kgl. Bayerisches Landwehr-Infanterie-Regiment Nr. 12
- 2. Eskadron/Kgl. Bayerisches 2. Chevaulegers-Regiment Taxis
- Kgl. Bayerischer Artillerie-Kommandeur 23
  - Kgl. Bayerisches Landwehr-Feldartillerie-Regiment Nr. 6
- Stab Kgl. Bayerisches Pionier-Bataillon Nr. 26
  - Kgl. Bayerische Reserve-Pionier-Kompanie Nr. 16
  - Kgl. Bayerische Landsturm-Pionier-Kompanie Nr. 10
  - Kgl. Bayerische Minenwerfer-Kompanie Nr. 306
- Kgl. Bayerischer Divisions-Nachrichten-Kommandeur 506
