= 25th Division (German Empire) =

25th Division (25. Division); from August 2, 1914, 25th Infantry Division (25. Infanterie-Division)
- Active: 1842–1919
- Country: Hesse/Germany
- Branch: Army
- Type: Infantry/Artillery (in peacetime included Cavalry)
- Size: Approx. 15,000
- Part of: XVIII Army Corps (XVIII. Armeekorps)
- Garrison/HQ: Darmstadt
- Patron: Grand Duke of Hesse
- Engagements: Franco-Prussian War: Mars-la-Tour, Gravelotte, Metz, Noiseville, 2nd Orléans; World War I: Great Retreat, 1st Marne, Race to the Sea, Verdun, Somme, Passchendaele, German spring offensive

The 25th Division (25. Division), officially the Grand Ducal Hessian (25th) Division (Großherzoglich Hessische (25.) Division), was a unit of the Prussian/German Army. It was headquartered in Darmstadt, the capital of the Grand Duchy of Hesse. The division was subordinated in peacetime to XVIII Army Corps (XVIII. Armeekorps) when that corps was formed in 1899. The division was disbanded in 1919, during the demobilization of the German Army after World War I.

As the formal name indicates, the division was raised and recruited in the Grand Duchy of Hesse.

== Evolution of the Grand Ducal Hessian Division ==
The Grand Ducal Hessian (25th) Division was officially formed on December 20, 1842, as the Infantry Division Command (Infanterie-Divisions-Kommando), but the division-strength Hessian Army had been around before that date. During the Napoleonic Wars, Hesse fielded a division-strength troop corps (Truppenkorps). In 1820, as part of the Hessian troop contribution to the German Confederation's Federal Army (Bundesheer), Hesse reorganized its army into two brigades of infantry, 1/2 company of horse artillery, two companies of foot artillery, one light horse regiment, one trains company and one sapper (later pioneer) company. This force was placed under the Infantry Division Command in 1842. On February 5, 1849, this force was redesignated the Grand Ducal Army Division (Großherzogliche Armee-Division). The organization of the Grand Ducal Army Division in 1858 was as follows:

- Army Division Staff
- Guard NCO Company
- General Quartermaster Staff with Pioneer Company
- Guard Light Horse Regiment
- Grand Ducal Artillery Corps
- Two infantry brigades of two regiments of two battalions each (8 total battalions, each with 5 companies).

In 1860, the cavalry was expanded to brigade strength. In 1867, Hesse, on the losing side of the Austro-Prussian War, entered into a convention with Prussia on military matters and reorganized its division along Prussian lines. The division was redesignated the Grand Ducal Hessian (25th) Division. It formally became a part of the Prussian Army in 1872, in accordance with the military convention of June 13, 1871.

The organization of the division at the beginning of the Franco-Prussian War in 1870 was as follows:

- 49. Infanterie-Brigade
  - Hessisches Leib-Garde-Regiment Nr. 1
  - Hessisches Infanterie-Regiment Nr. 2
  - Hessisches Gardejäger-Bataillon Nr. 1
- 50. Infanterie-Brigade
  - Hessisches Leib-Regiment Nr. 3
  - Hessisches Infanterie-Regiment Nr. 4
  - Hessisches Leibjäger-Bataillon Nr. 2
- Hessische 25. Kavallerie-Brigade
  - Hessisches 1. Reiter-Regiment
  - Hessisches 2. Reiter-Regiment

== Combat chronicle ==
During the Franco-Prussian War, the Grand Ducal Hesse (25th) Division was subordinated to the Prussian IX Army Corps, along with the 18th Infantry Division. The Hessians fought in the battles of Mars-la-Tour and Gravelotte, and then participated in the Siege of Metz. It then fought at Noiseville and in the Second Battle of Orléans.

During World War I, the Grand Ducal Hesse (25th) Infantry Division served on the Western Front. It fought in the opening campaigns, including the Allied Great Retreat that culminated in the First Battle of the Marne, and the subsequent Race to the Sea. After a period in the trenches, the division was heavily engaged in 1916 in the Battle of Verdun and the Battle of the Somme. In 1917, it fought in the battle of Passchendaele, also known as the Third Battle of Ypres. In 1918 it participated in the German spring offensive and ended the war resisting the subsequent Allied counteroffensives. Allied intelligence rated the division as first class.

== Pre-World War I organization ==
German divisions underwent various organizational changes after the Franco-Prussian War. The division was subordinated to the newly created XVIII Army Corps in 1899 and in the same year the division's 25th Field Artillery Brigade was created. The organization of the 25th Division in 1914, shortly before the outbreak of World War I, was as follows:

- 49. Infanterie-Brigade (1. Großherzoglich Hessische)
  - Leibgarde-Infanterie-Regiment (1. Großherzoglich Hessisches) Nr. 115
  - Infanterie-Regiment Kaiser Wilhelm (2. Großherzoglich Hessisches) Nr. 116
  - Infanterie-Regiment (5. Großherzoglich Hessisches) Nr. 168
- 50. Infanterie-Brigade (2. Großherzoglich Hessische)
  - Infanterie-Leibregiment Großherzogin (3. Großherzoglich Hessisches) Nr. 117
  - Infanterie-Regiment Prinz Carl (4. Großherzoglich Hessisches) Nr. 118
- 25. Kavallerie-Brigade (Großherzoglich Hessische)
  - Garde-Dragoner-Regiment (1. Großherzoglich Hessisches) Nr. 23
  - Leib-Dragoner-Regiment (2. Großherzoglich Hessisches) Nr. 24
- 25. Feldartillerie-Brigade (Großherzoglich Hessische)
  - Großherzogliches Artilleriekorps, 1. Großherzoglich Hessisches Feldartillerie-Regiment Nr. 25
  - 2. Großherzoglich Hessisches Feldartillerie-Regiment Nr. 61
- Großherzoglich Hessische Train-Abteilung Nr. 18
- Großherzoglich Hessische Garde-Unteroffizier Kompanie

== Order of battle on mobilization ==
On mobilization in August 1914, at the beginning of World War I, most divisional cavalry, including brigade headquarters, was withdrawn to form cavalry divisions or split up among divisions as reconnaissance units. Divisions received engineer companies and other support units from their higher headquarters. The 25th Cavalry Brigade was sent to help form the 3rd Cavalry Division and the 25th Division received cavalry support from the cavalry brigade of the 21st Division, its sister division in the XVIII Army Corps. The 25th Division was renamed the 25th Infantry Division and its initial wartime organization was as follows:

- 49. Infanterie-Brigade (1. Großherzoglich Hessische)
  - Leibgarde-Infanterie-Regiment (1. Großherzoglich Hessisches) Nr. 115
  - Infanterie-Regiment Kaiser Wilhelm (2. Großherzoglich Hessisches) Nr. 116
- 50. Infanterie-Brigade (2. Großherzoglich Hessische)
  - Infanterie-Leibregiment Großherzogin (3. Großherzoglich Hessisches) Nr. 117
  - Infanterie-Regiment Prinz Carl (4. Großherzoglich Hessisches) Nr. 118
- Magdeburgisches Dragoner-Regiment Nr. 6
- 25. Feldartillerie-Brigade (Großherzoglich Hessische)
  - Großherzogliches Artilleriekorps, 1. Großherzoglich Hessisches Feldartillerie-Regiment Nr. 25
  - 2. Großherzoglich Hessisches Feldartillerie-Regiment Nr. 61
- 2.Kompanie/1. Nassauisches Pionier-Bataillon Nr. 21
- 3.Kompanie/1. Nassauisches Pionier-Bataillon Nr. 21

== Late World War I organization ==
Divisions underwent many changes during the war, with regiments moving from division to division, and some being destroyed and rebuilt. During the war, most divisions became triangular - one infantry brigade with three infantry regiments rather than two infantry brigades of two regiments (a "square division"). An artillery commander replaced the artillery brigade headquarters, the cavalry was further reduced, the engineer contingent was increased, and a divisional signals command was created. The 25th Infantry Division's order of battle on February 19, 1918, was as follows:

- 49. Infanterie-Brigade (1. Großherzoglich Hessische)
  - Leibgarde-Infanterie-Regiment (1. Großherzoglich Hessisches) Nr. 115
  - Infanterie-Regiment Kaiser Wilhelm (2. Großherzoglich Hessisches) Nr. 116
  - Infanterie-Leibregiment Großherzogin (3. Großherzoglich Hessisches) Nr. 117
  - Maschinengewehr-Scharfschützen-Abteilung Nr. 49
- 1.Eskadron/Magdeburgisches Dragoner-Regiment Nr. 6
- Artillerie-Kommandeur 25:
  - Großherzogliches Artilleriekorps, 1. Großherzoglich Hessisches Feldartillerie-Regiment Nr. 25
  - I.Bataillon/Reserve-Feldartillerie-Regiment Nr. 24
- Stab Pionier-Bataillon Nr. 129:
  - 3.Kompanie/1. Nassauisches Pionier-Bataillon Nr. 21
  - Reserve-Pionier-Kompanie Nr. 89
  - Minenwerfer-Kompanie Nr. 25
- Divisions-Nachrichten-Kommandeur 25

== Commanders ==
- Generalleutnant Louis IV, Grand Duke of Hesse (1867-1877)
- Generalleutnant Hermann von Wichmann (1877-1879)
- General der Kavallerie Prince Heinrich of Hesse and by Rhine (1879-1887)
- Generalleutnant Friedrich von Wißmann (1887-1889)
- Generalleutnant Adolf von Bülow (1890-1895)
- Generalleutnant Heinrich von Gossler (1895-1896)
- Generalleutnant Friedrich von Müller (1896-1898)
- Generalleutnant Wilhelm Schilling von Cannstatt (1898-1900)
- Generalleutnant Georg von Perbandt (1900-1902)
- Generalleutnant Karl von Gall (1902-1906)
- Generalleutnant Hermann von Strantz (1906-1911)
- Generalleutnant Otto von Plüskow (1911- 1913)
- Generalleutnant Walther von Lüttwitz (1914-1914)
- Generalmajor/Generalleutnant Viktor Kühne (1914-1916)
- Generalmajor/Generalleutnant Hermann von Dresler und Scharfenstein (1916-1919)
