= 21st Division (German Empire) =

21st Division (21. Division); in 1870-71 and from August 2, 1914, 21st Infantry Division (21. Infanterie-Division)
- Active: 1866-1919
- Country: Prussia/Germany
- Branch: Army
- Type: Infantry (in peacetime included cavalry)
- Size: Approx. 15,000
- Part of: XI. Army Corps (XI. Armeekorps) (1866-1899); XVIII. Army Corps (XVIII. Armeekorps) (1899-1919)
- Garrison/HQ: Frankfurt am Main
- Engagements: Franco-Prussian War: Woerth, Sedan, Paris; World War I: Great Retreat, 1st Marne, Race to the Sea, Verdun, Somme, 2nd Aisne, German spring offensive, 2nd Somme

The 21st Division (21. Division) was a unit of the Prussian/German Army. It was formed on October 11, 1866, and was headquartered in Frankfurt am Main. The division was subordinated in peacetime initially to the XI Army Corps (XI. Armeekorps) and from 1899 to the XVIII Army Corps (XVIII. Armeekorps).

The division was recruited in the formerly independent Duchy of Nassau and the Electorate of Hesse, which had been incorporated into Prussia after the Austro-Prussian War, and in the city of Frankfurt am Main.

The division was disbanded in 1919 during the demobilization of the German Army after World War I.

== Combat chronicle ==
During the Franco-Prussian War, the 21st Infantry Division fought in the opening Battle of Woerth and the major Battle of Sedan. It subsequently participated in the Siege of Paris.

In World War I in 1914, the 21st Infantry Division fought in the Allied Great Retreat, including the First Battle of the Marne, and in the Race to the Sea. In 1916, it saw action in the Battle of Verdun and the Battle of the Somme. In 1917, it fought in the Second Battle of the Aisne. It served in the German 1918 Spring Offensive, including the Second Battle of the Somme. Allied intelligence rated the division as first class.

== Order of battle in the Franco-Prussian War ==
During wartime, the 21st Division, like other regular German divisions, was redesignated an infantry division. The organization of the 21st Infantry Division in 1870 at the beginning of the Franco-Prussian War was as follows:

- 41. Infanterie-Brigade
  - Füsilier-Regiment Nr. 34
  - Füsilier-Regiment Nr. 80
- 42. Infanterie-Brigade
  - Infanterie-Regiment Nr. 81
  - Infanterie-Regiment Nr. 88
- Jäger-Bataillon Nr. 11
- Dragoner-Regiment Nr. 5

== Pre-World War I organization ==
German divisions underwent various organizational changes after the Franco-Prussian War. As noted above, the 21st Division was reorganized to become primarily a Hannover/Brunswick unit. The organization of the 21st Division in 1914, shortly before the outbreak of World War I, was as follows:

- 41. Infanterie-Brigade:
  - 1. Nassauisches Infanterie-Regiment Nr. 87
  - 2. Nassauisches Infanterie-Regiment Nr. 88
- 42.Infanterie-Brigade:
  - Füsilier-Regiment von Gerdsdorff (1. Kurhessisches) Nr. 80
  - Infanterie-Regiment Landgraf Friedrich I. von Hessen-Kassel (1. Kurhessisches) Nr. 81
- 21. Kavallerie-Brigade:
  - Magdeburgisches Dragoner-Regiment Nr. 6
  - Thüringisches Ulanen-Regiment Nr. 6
- 21. Feldartillerie-Brigade:
  - 1. Nassauisches Feldartillerie-Regiment Nr. 27
  - 2. Nassauisches Feldartillerie-Regiment Nr. 63

== Order of battle on mobilization ==
On mobilization in August 1914 at the beginning of World War I, most divisional cavalry, including brigade headquarters, was withdrawn to form cavalry divisions or split up among divisions as reconnaissance units. Divisions received engineer companies and other support units from their higher headquarters. The 21st Division was again renamed the 21st Infantry Division and its initial wartime organization was as follows:

- 41. Infanterie-Brigade:
  - 1. Nassauisches Infanterie-Regiment Nr. 87
  - 2. Nassauisches Infanterie-Regiment Nr. 88
- 42.Infanterie-Brigade:
  - Füsilier-Regiment von Gerdsdorff (1. Kurhessisches) Nr. 80
  - Infanterie-Regiment Landgraf Friedrich I. von Hessen-Kassel (1. Kurhessisches) Nr. 81
- Thüringisches Ulanen-Regiment Nr. 6
- 21. Feldartillerie-Brigade:
  - 1. Nassauisches Feldartillerie-Regiment Nr. 27
  - 2. Nassauisches Feldartillerie-Regiment Nr. 63
- 1.Kompanie/1. Nassauisches Pionier-Bataillon Nr. 21

== Late World War I organization ==
Divisions underwent many changes during the war, with regiments moving from division to division, and some being destroyed and rebuilt. During the war, most divisions became triangular - one infantry brigade with three infantry regiments rather than two infantry brigades of two regiments (a "square division"). An artillery commander replaced the artillery brigade headquarters, the cavalry was further reduced, the engineer contingent was increased, and a divisional signals command was created. The 21st Infantry Division's order of battle on April 28, 1918, was as follows:

- 42. Infanterie-Brigade:
  - Füsilier-Regiment von Gerdsdorff (1. Kurhessisches) Nr. 80
  - Infanterie-Regiment Landgraf Friedrich I. von Hessen-Kassel (1. Kurhessisches) Nr. 81
  - 1. Nassauisches Infanterie-Regiment Nr. 87
- 2.Eskadron/Magdeburgisches Dragoner-Regiment Nr. 6
- Artillerie-Kommandeur 21:
  - 1. Nassauisches Feldartillerie-Regiment Nr. 27
  - II.Bataillon/Badisches Fußartillerie-Regiment Nr. 14 (from May 7, 1918)
- Stab 1. Nassauisches Pionier-Bataillon Nr. 21:
  - 1.Kompanie/1. Nassauisches Pionier-Bataillon Nr. 21
  - 5.Kompanie/1. Nassauisches Pionier-Bataillon Nr. 21
  - Minenwerfer-Kompanie Nr. 21
- Divisions-Nachrichten-Kommandeur 21
