= Battle of Orlau-Frankenau =

1914 battle of the East Prussian campaign

Battle of Orlau–Frankenau
- Part of the Russian invasion of East Prussia and the opening operations before the Battle of Tannenberg
Date	23–24 August 1914
Location	Orlau, Lahna and Frankenau, East Prussia, German Empire
Result	Russian tactical victory

Belligerents
Germany	Russia

Commanders and leaders
Friedrich von Scholtz; Hermann von Staabs	Alexander Samsonov; Nikolai Martos

Units involved
Eighth Army; XX Corps; 37th Infantry Division; 70th Landwehr Brigade	Second Army; XV Army Corps elements of XIII Army Corps

Casualties and losses
Not securely established	Approximately 3,000–4,000

The Battle of Orlau–Frankenau was fought on 23–24 August 1914 during the opening phase of the Russian invasion of East Prussia in the First World War. German sources also refer to the action as the engagement at Orlau–Lahna–Frankenau, German: Gefecht bei Orlau–Lahna–Frankenau, or the engagement at Lahna and Orlau, German: Gefecht bei Lahna und Orlau.

The battle was fought between the German XX Corps under Friedrich von Scholtz and the Russian XV Army Corps of Alexander Samsonov's Second Army, commanded by Nikolai Martos. The Russian XV Corps captured Lahna on 23 August and forced the German forward positions at Orlau and Frankenau to be abandoned on 24 August. Although the engagement was a Russian tactical success, the German XX Corps delayed Samsonov's central formations and remained available for the German concentration that led to the encirclement of much of the Russian Second Army at the Battle of Tannenberg.

== Background ==
After the Russian Second Army crossed the East Prussian frontier, Samsonov's central corps advanced northward while the German Eighth Army reorganized after the Battle of Gumbinnen. The Russian XV Corps, commanded by Martos, formed one of the principal formations in the centre of Samsonov's army. Its advance brought it against Scholtz's XX Corps, which held a forward defensive position in southern East Prussia.

Scholtz's corps included the 37th Infantry Division and the 41st Infantry Division, but the immediate fighting around Orlau, Lahna and Frankenau was carried mainly by the 37th Infantry Division and attached Landwehr formations. Russian accounts identify the opposing German force as including the 37th Infantry Division and elements of the 70th Landwehr Brigade. The position blocked the direct advance of XV Corps and forced the Russian formation to deploy for battle rather than continue its march.

== Battle ==
The Russian XV Corps reached the German position on 23 August. Alfred Knox, the British military attaché accompanying the Russian armies, described the German line as extending through Frankenau, Lahna and Orlau, with infantry and artillery holding prepared positions. Martos deployed the 8th Infantry Division against the German centre and right, while the 6th Infantry Division operated toward Frankenau.

Lahna became the first major break in the German position. According to Knox, the Russian 31st Infantry Regiment entered Lahna at about 8:30 p.m. on 23 August after several hours of fighting. German accounts record that the troops holding Lahna withdrew after sustained Russian pressure made the position untenable. The loss of Lahna weakened the German centre and exposed the neighbouring positions at Orlau and Frankenau to renewed attack.

Martos ordered the assault to continue on 24 August and requested cooperation from XIII Army Corps against the German left. The Russian attack resumed before the artillery preparation had been fully organized, but pressure increased across the German line as the XV Corps advanced against Orlau and Frankenau. Russian accounts state that Orlau and Frankenau were taken during the morning.

The German forward line collapsed locally, but Scholtz's corps was not destroyed. Russian cavalry and neighbouring formations failed to convert the success into an immediate pursuit, and the German withdrawal retained enough cohesion to prevent the loss of the entire corps. Martos later complained that the support expected from XIII Corps had not been effective and that XV Corps had carried the main attack across too wide a front.

== Aftermath ==
The battle forced XX Corps to give up its forward positions, but the delay imposed on the Russian Second Army became operationally important. By the evening of 24 August, Samsonov's central formations had won ground but had not broken through quickly enough to prevent the German Eighth Army from reorganizing its forces. Knox recorded the XV Corps still around Orlau and Frankenau on the night of 25 August, showing that the tactical success had not produced a rapid exploitation.

The German command subsequently concentrated against Samsonov's exposed army. XX Corps, although forced back at Orlau–Frankenau, continued to hold and delay the Russian centre while German formations attacked the Russian flanks. The Battle of Orlau–Frankenau therefore formed part of the sequence of engagements immediately preceding the Battle of Tannenberg, where much of the Russian Second Army was encircled and destroyed.

== Casualties ==
Casualty figures for the battle are uncertain. Golovine gives Russian losses as approximately 3,000 lower ranks, together with a number of officers, and records the capture of two German guns, several machine guns and about 100 prisoners. Knox gives a Russian estimate of about 4,000 Russian casualties and notes that Russian estimates of German losses were speculative. Because the available sources do not provide a secure German total, German casualties are best left unstated.

== Bibliography ==
- Buttar, Prit (2014). Collision of Empires: The War on the Eastern Front in 1914. Oxford: Osprey Publishing. ISBN 978-1-78200-648-0.
- Dehnen, Max (1966). Die Kriegsgräber in Ostpreußen von 1914/15 (PDF) (in German). Würzburg: Holzner-Verlag.
- Golovine, Nicholas N. (1933). The Russian Campaign of 1914: The Beginning of the War and Operations in East Prussia. Translated by Muntz, A. G. S. Fort Leavenworth, Kansas: Command and General Staff School Press.
- Knox, Alfred (1921). With the Russian Army, 1914–1917. Vol. 1. London: Hutchinson & Co.
- Reichsarchiv (1925). Der Weltkrieg 1914 bis 1918 (in German). Vol. 2: Die Befreiung Ostpreußens. Berlin: E. S. Mittler & Sohn.

== See also ==
- East Prussian campaign (World War I)
- Battle of Gumbinnen
- Battle of Tannenberg
- First Battle of the Masurian Lakes
