= 8th Army (German Empire) =

8. Armee; 8th Army
- Flag of the Staff of an Armee Oberkommando (1871–1918)
- Active: 2 August 1914 – 29 September 1915; 30 December 1915 – 21 January 1919
- Country: German Empire
- Type: Army
- Engagements: World War I: Eastern Front; Battle of Stallupönen; Battle of Gumbinnen; Battle of Tannenberg; First Battle of the Masurian Lakes; Lodz offensive; Battle of Augustów; Second Battle of the Masurian Lakes

Insignia
- Abbreviation: A.O.K. 8

The 8th Army (German: 8. Armee / Armeeoberkommando 8 / A.O.K. 8) was an army level command of the German Army in World War I. It was formed on mobilization in August 1914 from the I Army Inspectorate. The army was dissolved on 29 September 1915, but reformed on 30 December 1915. It was finally disbanded in 1919 during demobilization after the war.

== History ==
On mobilization in August 1914, the 8th Army Headquarters was formed in Posen to command troops stationed in East Prussia to defend against the expected Russian attack, Plan XIX. Initially, the Army commanded the following formations:

- I Corps (Generalleutnant Hermann von François based on Königsberg)
- XVII Corps (General der Kavallerie August von Mackensen based on Danzig)
- XX Corps (General der Infanterie Friedrich von Scholtz based on Allenstein)
- I Reserve Corps (Generalleutnant Otto von Below formed on mobilisation)
- Landwehr Corps (General der Infanterie Remus von Woyrsch formed on mobilisation)
- 3rd Reserve Division (Generalleutnant Kurt von Morgen, formed on mobilisation)
- 1st Cavalry Division (Generalleutnant Hermann Brecht, formed on mobilisation)

Concerned by the defeat at Gumbinnen and the continued advance of the Russian Second Army from the south, Prittwitz ordered a retreat to the Vistula, effectively abandoning East Prussia. When he heard of this, Helmuth von Moltke, the German Army Chief of Staff, recalled Prittwitz and his deputy to Berlin. They were replaced by Paul von Hindenburg, called out of retirement, with Erich Ludendorff as his chief of staff. Under its new command, the Army was responsible for the victories at the Battles of Tannenberg and Masurian Lakes.

== Dissolved and reformed ==
The Army of the Niemen was formed on 26 May 1915 to control the troops in Courland. The commander of the 8th Army, General der Infanterie Otto von Below, along with his chief of staff, Generalmajor von Böckmann, assumed command. In the meantime, the 8th Army got a deputy commander, General der Artillerie Friedrich von Scholtz, who was simultaneously commander of XX Corps. 8th Army was dissolved on 29 September 1915. On 30 December 1915 the Army of the Niemen was renamed as the 8th Army with von Below still in command.

== Commanders ==
The original 8th Army had the following commanders-in-chief from mobilisation until it was dissolved 29 September 1915.

8th Army
| From | Commander | Previously | Subsequently, |
|---|---|---|---|
| 2 August 1914 | Generaloberst Maximilian von Prittwitz | I Army Inspectorate (I. Armee-Inspektion) | Retired |
| 23 August 1914 | Generaloberst Paul von Hindenburg | Brought out of retirement | 9th Army |
| 18 September 1914 | General der Artillerie Richard von Schubert | XIV Reserve Corps | XXVII Reserve Corps from 27 October 1914 |
| 9 October 1914 | General der Infanterie Hermann von François | I Corps | XXXXI Reserve Corps from 24 December 1914 |
| 7 November 1914 | General der Infanterie Otto von Below | I Reserve Corps | Army of the Niemen |
| 26 May 1915 | General der Artillerie Friedrich von Scholtz | Simultaneously commander of XX Corps | XX Corps |

A "new" 8th Army was formed by renaming the Army of the Niemen on 30 December 1915. It was dissolved after the end of the war on 21 January 1919.

"New" 8th Army
| From | Commander | Previously | Subsequently, |
|---|---|---|---|
| 30 December 1915 | General der Infanterie Otto von Below | Army of the Niemen | Heeresgruppe Below |
| 5 October 1916 | General der Infanterie Max von Fabeck | 12th Army | Died 16 December 1916 |
| 22 October 1916 | General der Infanterie Bruno von Mudra | XVI Corps | Armee-Abteilung A |
| 2 January 1917 | General der Artillerie Friedrich von Scholtz | Armee-Abteilung Scholtz | Heeresgruppe Scholtz |
| 22 April 1917 | General der Infanterie Oskar von Hutier | Armee-Abteilung D | 18th Army from 27 December 1917 |
| 12 December 1917 | General der Infanterie Günther Graf von Kirchbach | Armee-Abteilung D | Heeresgruppe Kiev |
| 27 January 1918 | Generaloberst Günther Graf von Kirchbach | Armee-Abteilung D | Heeresgruppe Kiev |
| 31 July 1918 | General der Infanterie Hugo von Kathen | XXIII Reserve Corps | Commander of German troops in Lithuania and Estonia |

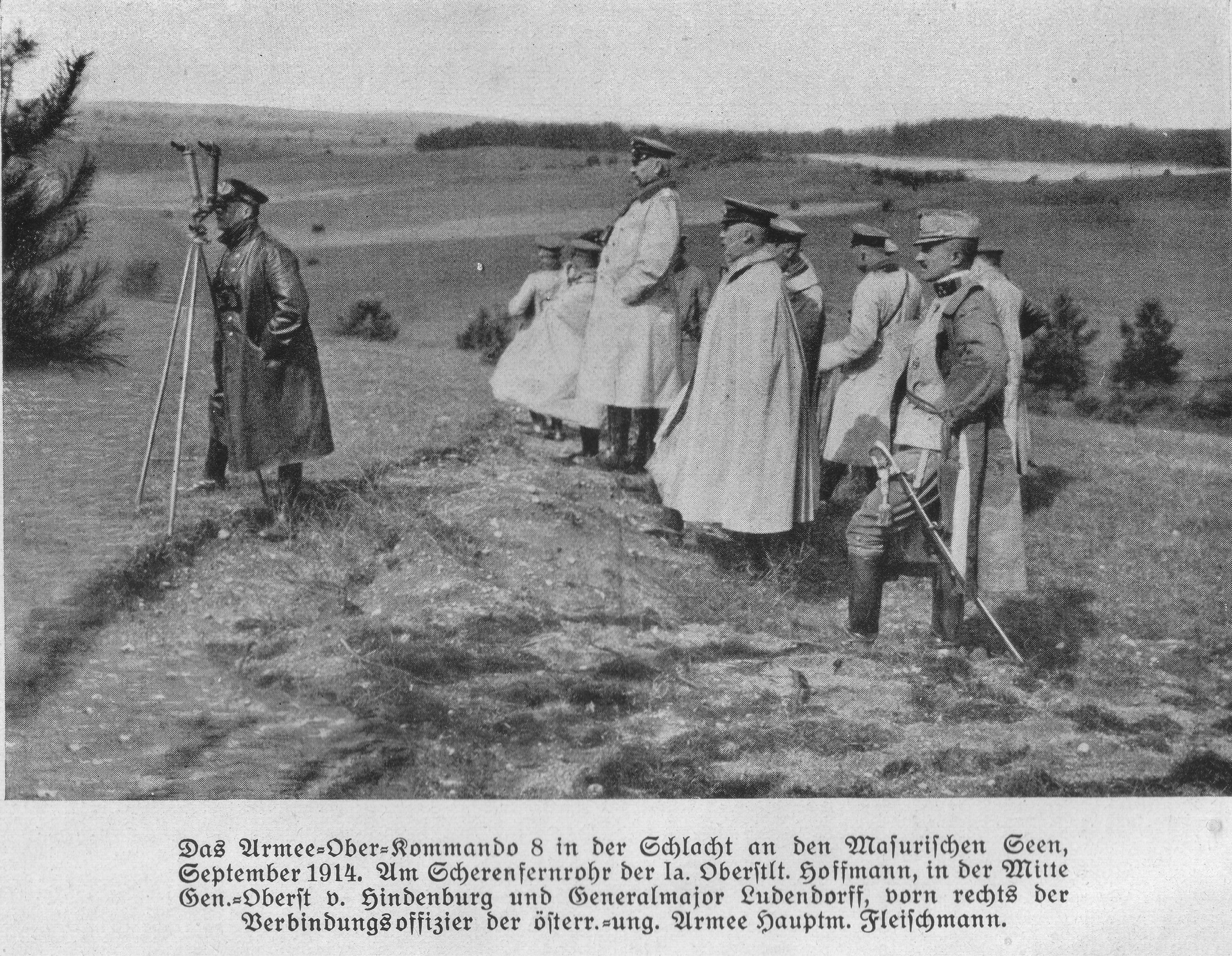
Staff of the 8th Army, First Battle of the Masurian Lakes.

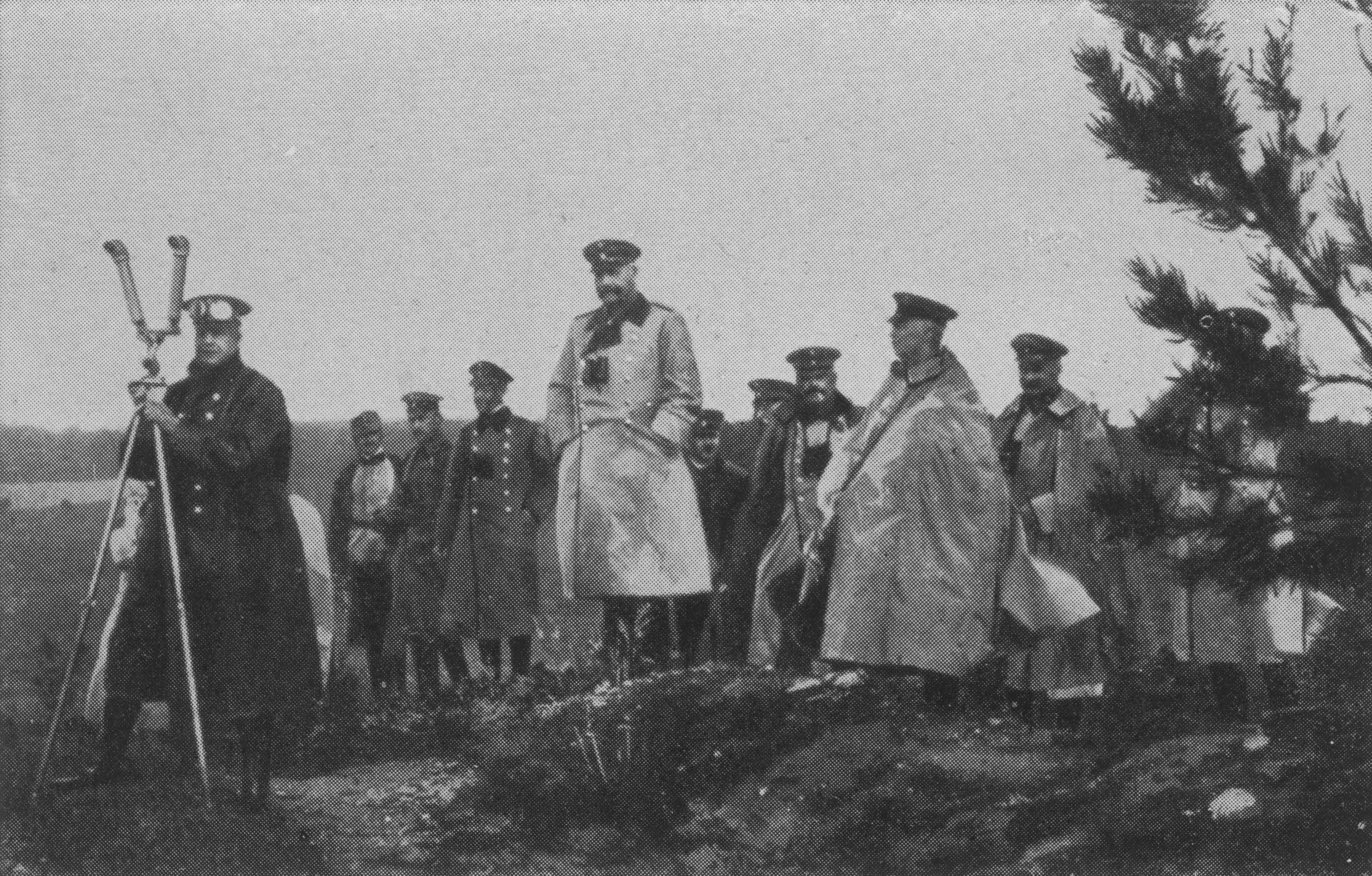

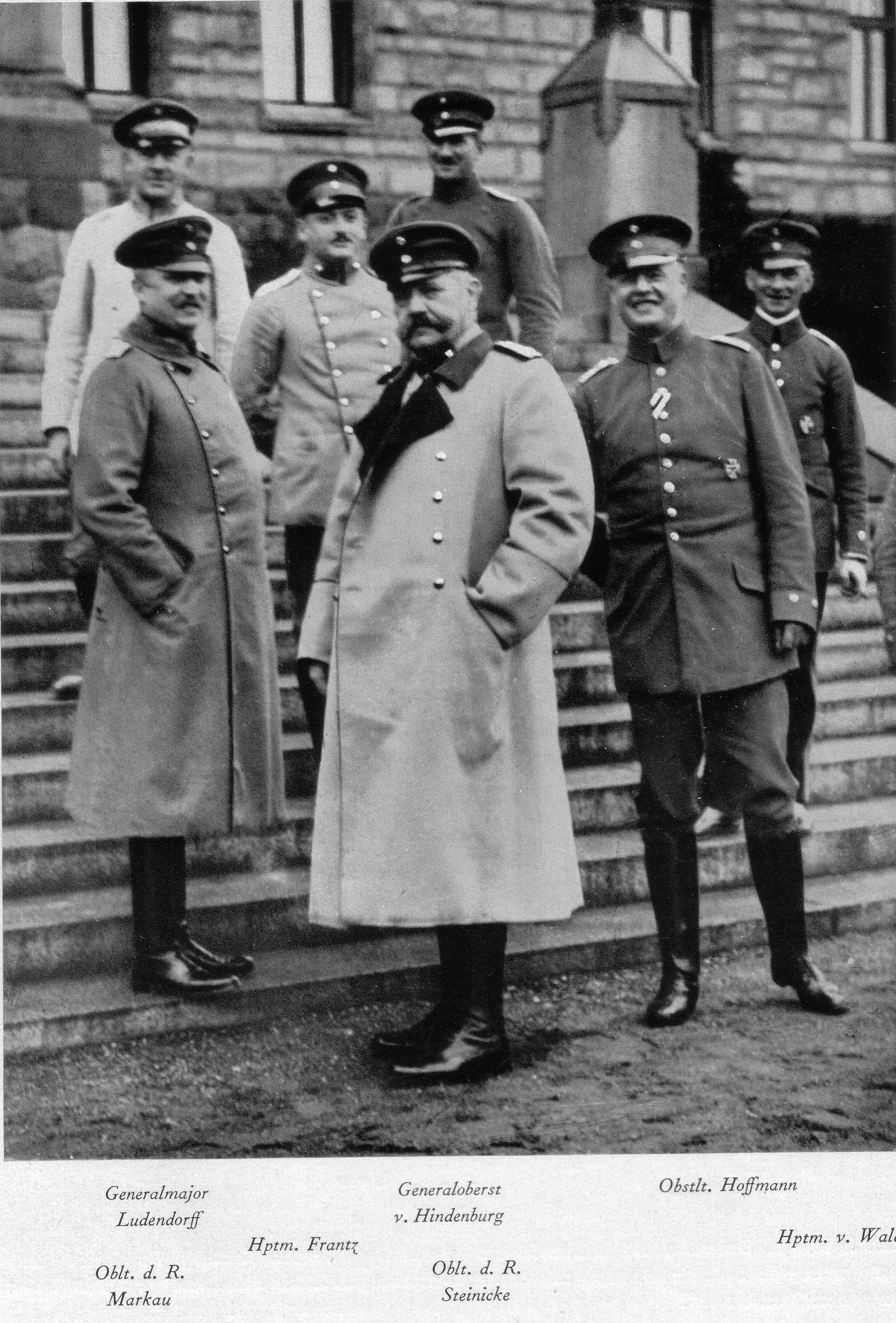
Staff of the 8th Army, autumn 1914, Imperial Castle in Poznań.

== Glossary ==
- Armee-Abteilung or Army Detachment in the sense of "something detached from an Army". It is not under the command of an Army so is in itself a small Army.
- Armee-Gruppe or Army Group in the sense of a group within an Army and under its command, generally formed as a temporary measure for a specific task.
- Heeresgruppe or Army Group in the sense of a number of armies under a single commander.

== See also ==
- 8th Army (Wehrmacht) for the equivalent formation in World War II
- German Army order of battle (1914)
- Order of battle at Tannenberg
- Great Retreat (Russian)

== Bibliography ==
- Cron, Hermann (2002). Imperial German Army 1914–18: Organisation, Structure, Orders-of-Battle [first published: 1937]. Helion & Co. ISBN 1-874622-70-1.
