= General von Kirchbach =

General von Kirchbach may refer to:

- Günther von Kirchbach (1850–1925), German Imperial Army colonel general
- Hans von Kirchbach (1849–1928), German Imperial Army colonel general
- Hans-Peter von Kirchbach (born 1941), German Army general
- Hugo von Kirchbach (1809–1887), Prussian Army General of the Infantry
