= Armee-Abteilung D =

Armee-Abteilung Scholtz Armee-Abteilung D Army Detachment D
- Flag of the Staff of an Armee Oberkommando (1871–1918)
- Active: 28 October 1915 – 2 October 1918
- Country: German Empire
- Type: Army
- Engagements: World War I

Armee-Abteilung Scholtz / Armee-Abteilung D (Army Detachment D) was an army level command of the German Army in World War I. It served on the Eastern Front throughout its existence.

== History ==
Armee-Abteilung D was formed on 18 September 1915 from the southern wing of the Army of the Niemen as Armee-Gruppe Scholtz, named for the commander of XX Corps, a headquarters that it absorbed. On 28 October 1915 it was redesignated Armee-Abteilung Scholtz. It was established on 10 January 1917 as Armee-Abteilung D. It was dissolved on 2 October 1918 as a new XX Corps was created.

== Commanders ==
Armee-Abteilung D had the following commanders during its existence:

Armee-Abteilung Scholtz / Armee-Abteilung D
From	Commander	Previously	Subsequently,
28 October 1915	General der Artillerie Friedrich von Scholtz	XX Corps	8th Army
2 January 1917	Generalleutnant Oskar von Hutier	XXI Corps	8th Army
27 January 1917	General der Infanterie Oskar von Hutier	XXI Corps	8th Army
22 April 1917	General der Infanterie Günther Graf von Kirchbach	Landwehr Corps	8th Army
12 December 1917	General der Artillerie Hans von Kirchbach	XII Reserve Corps	Retired
23 January 1918	Generaloberst Hans von Kirchbach	XII Reserve Corps	Retired

== Glossary ==
- Armee-Abteilung or Army Detachment in the sense of "something detached from an Army". It is not under the command of an Army so is in itself a small Army.
- Armee-Gruppe or Army Group in the sense of a group within an Army and under its command, generally formed as a temporary measure for a specific task.
- Heeresgruppe or Army Group in the sense of a number of armies under a single commander.

== See also ==
- XX Corps

== Bibliography ==
- Cron, Hermann (2002). Imperial German Army 1914–18: Organisation, Structure, Orders-of-Battle [first published: 1937]. Helion & Co. ISBN 1-874622-70-1.
