= 23rd Reserve Division =

23rd Reserve Division (23. Reserve-Division)
- Active: 1914–1919
- Country: Saxony/Germany
- Branch: Army
- Type: Infantry
- Size: Approx. 15,000
- Engagements: World War I: Great Retreat, First Battle of the Marne, Second Battle of Champagne, Battle of the Somme, Passchendaele, German spring offensive

The Royal Saxon 23rd Reserve Division (Kgl. Sächsische 23. Reserve-Division) was a unit of the Imperial German Army in World War I. The division was formed on mobilization of the German Army in August 1914 as part of the XII (Royal Saxon) Reserve Corps. The division was raised in the Kingdom of Saxony and was disbanded in 1919 during the demobilization of the German Army after World War I.

== Combat chronicle ==
The 23rd Reserve Division fought on the Western Front, participating in the opening German offensive which led to the Allied Great Retreat and ended with the First Battle of the Marne. Thereafter, the division remained in the line in the Champagne region through the end of 1914 and until July 1916 and fought in the Second Battle of Champagne in the autumn of 1915. In late July 1916, the division entered the Battle of the Somme. It remained in the Somme, Artois and Flanders regions thereafter. After a brief rest in April 1917, the division went into the line on the Yser. Its sister division in the Royal Saxon XII Reserve Corps, the 24th Reserve Division, was sent to the Eastern Front at the end of April. The 23rd Reserve Division remained in Flanders, and faced the British in the Battle of Passchendaele. In October 1917, after the heavy fighting in Flanders, the division was sent to the Eastern Front, arriving in November. It was on the line facing the Russians when the armistice on the Eastern Front went into effect. The division then went to Latvia and after a few months of fighting occupied the area between the Daugava River and Lake Peipus. In March 1918, the division returned to the Western Front and was deployed in Flanders and the Artois. It then participated in the 1918 German spring offensive and remained in the line in the Flanders area until the end of the war. Allied intelligence rated the division as third class.

== Order of battle on mobilization ==
The order of battle of the 23rd Reserve Division on mobilization was as follows:

- 45. Reserve-Infanterie-Brigade
  - Kgl. Sächs. Reserve-Grenadier-Regiment Nr. 100
  - Kgl. Sächs. Reserve-Infanterie-Regiment Nr. 101
  - Kgl. Sächs. Reserve-Jäger-Bataillon Nr. 12
- 46. Reserve-Infanterie-Brigade
  - Kgl. Sächs. Reserve-Infanterie-Regiment Nr. 102
  - Kgl. Sächs. Reserve-Infanterie-Regiment Nr. 103
- Kgl. Sächs. Reserve-Husaren-Regiment
- Kgl. Sächs. Reserve-Feldartillerie-Regiment Nr. 23
- 4.Kompanie/Kgl. Sächs. 1. Pionier-Bataillon Nr. 12

== Order of battle on March 20, 1918 ==
The 23rd Reserve Division was triangularized in December 1916. Over the course of the war, other changes took place, including the formation of artillery and signals commands and a pioneer battalion. The order of battle on March 20, 1918, was as follows:

- 46. Reserve-Infanterie-Brigade
  - Kgl. Sächs. Reserve-Grenadier-Regiment Nr. 100
  - Kgl. Sächs. Reserve-Infanterie-Regiment Nr. 102
  - Infanterie-Regiment Nr. 392
- 2.Eskadron/Kgl. Sächs. Reserve-Husaren-Regiment
- Kgl. Sächs. Artillerie-Kommandeur 118
  - Kgl. Sächs. Reserve-Feldartillerie-Regiment Nr. 23
  - I.Bataillon/Reserve-Fußartillerie-Regiment Nr. 15
- Kgl. Sächs. Pionier-Bataillon Nr. 323
  - 4.Kompanie/Kgl. Sächs. 1.Pionier-Bataillon Nr. 12
  - 4 Reserve-Kompanie/Kgl. Sächs. 2.Pionier-Bataillon Nr. 22
  - Kgl. Sächs. Minenwerfer-Kompanie Nr. 223
- Kgl. Sächs. Divisions-Nachrichten-Kommandeur 423
