= 41st Division (German Empire) =

41st Division (41. Division); from August 2, 1914, 41st Infantry Division (41. Infanterie-Division)
- Active: 1912-1919
- Country: Prussia/Germany
- Branch: Army
- Type: Infantry (in peacetime included cavalry)
- Size: Approx. 15,000
- Part of: XX. Army Corps (XX. Armeekorps)
- Garrison/HQ: Deutsch Eylau
- Engagements: World War I: Tannenberg, 1st Masurian Lakes, Romania, 2nd Aisne, German spring offensive, Meuse-Argonne Offensive

Commanders
- Notable commanders: Hermann von Stein

The 41st Division (41. Division) was a unit of the Prussian/German Army. It was established on October 1, 1912, in Deutsch Eylau (now Iława, Poland). The division was subordinated in peacetime to the XX Army Corps (XX. Armeekorps). The division was disbanded in 1919 during the demobilization of the German Army after World War I. It was mainly recruited in the Prussian province of West Prussia.

== Pre-World War I organization ==
The organization of the 37th Division in 1914, shortly before the outbreak of World War I, was as follows:

- 72. Infanterie-Brigade
  - Infanterie-Regiment von Grolmann (1. Posensches) Nr. 18
  - Infanterie-Regiment Freiherr Hiller von Gaertringen (4. Posensches) Nr. 59
- 74. Infanterie-Brigade
  - 5. Westpreußisches Infanterie-Regiment Nr. 148
  - Deutsch Ordens-Infanterie-Regiment (1. Elsässisches) Nr. 152
- 41. Kavallerie-Brigade
  - Kürassier-Regiment Herzog Friedrich Eugen von Württemberg (Westpreußisches) Nr. 5
  - Ulanen-Regiment von Schmidt (1. Pommersches) Nr. 4
- 41. Feldartillerie-Brigade
  - 1. Westpreußisches Feldartillerie-Regiment Nr. 35
  - 3. Ostpreußisches Feldartillerie-Regiment Nr. 79

== Order of battle on mobilization ==
On mobilization in August 1914, at the beginning of World War I, most divisional cavalry, including brigade headquarters, was withdrawn to form cavalry divisions or split up among divisions as reconnaissance units. Divisions received engineer companies and other support units from their higher headquarters. The 41st Division was renamed the 41st Infantry Division. Its initial wartime organization was as follows:

- 72. Infanterie-Brigade
  - Infanterie-Regiment von Grolmann (1. Posensches) Nr. 18
  - Infanterie-Regiment Freiherr Hiller von Gaertringen (4. Posensches) Nr. 59
- 74. Infanterie-Brigade
  - 5. Westpreußisches Infanterie-Regiment Nr. 148
  - Deutsch Ordens-Infanterie-Regiment (1. Elsässisches) Nr. 152
- Dragoner-Regiment König Albert von Sachsen (Ostpreußisches) Nr. 10
- 41. Feldartillerie-Brigade
  - 1. Westpreußisches Feldartillerie-Regiment Nr. 35
  - 3. Ostpreußisches Feldartillerie-Regiment Nr. 79
- 2.Kompanie/Masurisches Pionier-Bataillon Nr. 26
- 3.Kompanie/Masurisches Pionier-Bataillon Nr. 26

== Combat chronicle ==
The 41st Infantry Division began World War I on the Eastern Front. It participated in the battles of Tannenberg and 1st Masurian Lakes. In 1916, it saw action in the Romanian Campaign. The division was transferred to the Western Front in February 1917. It occupied the trenchlines in 1917, and participated in the Second Battle of the Aisne, also called the Third Battle of Champagne. In 1918 participated in the German spring offensive. In the subsequent Allied counteroffensives, the division fought in the Meuse-Argonne. Allied intelligence rated the division a second class division.

== Late World War I organization ==
Divisions underwent many changes during the war, with regiments moving from division to division, and some being destroyed and rebuilt. During the war, most divisions became triangular - one infantry brigade with three infantry regiments rather than two infantry brigades of two regiments (a "square division"). The 41st Infantry Division was triangularized in May 1915. An artillery commander replaced the artillery brigade headquarters, the cavalry was further reduced, the engineer contingent was increased, and a divisional signals command was created. The 41st Infantry Division's order of battle on March 31, 1918, was as follows:

- 74. Infanterie-Brigade
  - Infanterie-Regiment von Grolmann (1. Posensches) Nr. 18
  - 5. Westpreußisches Infanterie-Regiment Nr. 148
  - Deutsch Ordens-Infanterie-Regiment (1. Elsässisches) Nr. 152
- 4. Eskadron/Dragoner-Regiment König Albert von Sachsen (Ostpreußisches) Nr. 10
- Artillerie-Kommandeur 41:
  - 3. Ostpreußisches Feldartillerie-Regiment Nr. 79
  - II. Bataillon/2. Pommersches Fußartillerie-Regiment Nr. 15
- Stab Pionier-Bataillon Nr. 26:
  - 1.Kompanie/Masurisches Pionier-Bataillon Nr. 26
  - 2.Kompanie/Masurisches Pionier-Bataillon Nr. 26
  - Minenwerfer-Kompanie Nr. 41
- Divisions-Nachrichten-Kommandeur 41
