= 37th Division (German Empire) =

37th Division (37. Division); from August 2, 1914, 37th Infantry Division (37. Infanterie-Division)
- Active: 1899–1919
- Country: Prussia/Germany
- Branch: Army
- Type: Infantry (in peacetime included cavalry)
- Size: Approx. 15,000
- Part of: I. Army Corps (VIII. Armeekorps); XX. Army Corps (XX. Armeekorps)
- Garrison/HQ: Allenstein
- Engagements: World War I: Tannenberg, 1st Masurian Lakes, Gorlice-Tarnów Offensive, German spring offensive, 3rd Aisne, Meuse-Argonne Offensive

Commanders
- Notable commanders: Alexander von Kluck, Max von Bahrfeldt

The 37th Division (37. Division) was a unit of the Prussian/German Army. It was formed between March 25 and April 1, 1899, in Allenstein (now Olsztyn, Poland). The division was initially subordinated in peacetime to the I Army Corps (I. Armeekorps). In 1912, it was transferred to the newly formed XX Army Corps (XX. Armeekorps). The division was disbanded in 1919 during the demobilization of the German Army after World War I. It was mainly recruited in the Prussian province of East Prussia.

== Pre-World War I organization ==
The organization of the 37th Division in 1914, shortly before the outbreak of World War I, was as follows:

- 73.Infanterie-Brigade
  - 2. Masurisches Infanterie-Regiment Nr. 147
  - 2. Ermländisches Infanterie-Regiment Nr. 151
- 75.Infanterie-Brigade
  - 1. Masurisches Infanterie-Regiment Nr. 146
  - 1. Ermländisches Infanterie-Regiment Nr. 150
- 37. Kavallerie-Brigade
  - Dragoner-Regiment König Albert von Sachsen (Ostpreußisches) Nr. 10
  - Dragoner-Regiment von Wedel (Pommersches) Nr. 11
- 37.Feldartillerie-Brigade
  - 1. Masurisches Feld-Artillerie-Regiment Nr. 73
  - 2. Masurisches Feld-Artillerie-Regiment Nr. 82
- Landwehr-Inspektion Allenstein

== Order of battle on mobilization ==
On mobilization in August 1914 at the beginning of World War I, most divisional cavalry, including brigade headquarters, was withdrawn to form cavalry divisions or split up among divisions as reconnaissance units. Divisions received engineer companies and other support units from their higher headquarters. The 37th Division was renamed the 37th Infantry Division. Its initial wartime organization was as follows:

- 73.Infanterie-Brigade
  - 2. Masurisches Infanterie-Regiment Nr. 147
  - 2. Ermländisches Infanterie-Regiment Nr. 151
  - Jäger-Bataillon Graf Yorck von Wartenburg (Ostpreußisches) Nr. 1 (to 05.IX.1914)
- 75.Infanterie-Brigade
  - 1. Masurisches Infanterie-Regiment Nr. 146
  - 1. Ermländisches Infanterie-Regiment Nr. 150
- Dragoner-Regiment von Wedel (Pommersches) Nr. 11
- 37.Feldartillerie-Brigade
  - 1. Masurisches Feld-Artillerie-Regiment Nr. 73
  - 2. Masurisches Feld-Artillerie-Regiment Nr. 82
- 1./Masurisches Pionier-Bataillon Nr. 26

== Combat chronicle ==
The 37th Infantry Division began World War I on the Eastern Front. It participated in the battles of Tannenberg and 1st Masurian Lakes. In 1915, it saw action in the Gorlice-Tarnów Offensive. The division was transferred to the Western Front in December 1916. It occupied the trenchlines in 1917, and in 1918 participated in the German spring offensive, seeing action in the Third Battle of the Aisne. In the subsequent Allied counteroffensives, the division fought in the Meuse-Argonne. Allied intelligence rated the division a first class shock division.

== Late World War I organization ==
Divisions underwent many changes during the war, with regiments moving from division to division, and some being destroyed and rebuilt. During the war, most divisions became triangular – one infantry brigade with three infantry regiments rather than two infantry brigades of two regiments (a "square division"). An artillery commander replaced the artillery brigade headquarters, the cavalry was further reduced, the engineer contingent was increased, and a divisional signals command was created. The 37th Infantry Division's order of battle on February 20, 1918, was as follows:

- 73.Infanterie-Brigade
  - 2. Masurisches Infanterie-Regiment Nr. 147
  - 1. Ermländisches Infanterie-Regiment Nr. 150
  - 2. Ermländisches Infanterie-Regiment Nr. 151
  - Maschinengewehr-Scharfschützen-Abteilung Nr. 57
- 3.Eskadron/Jäger-Regiment zu Pferde Nr. 10
- Artillerie-Kommandeur 37:
  - 1. Masurisches Feld-Artillerie-Regiment Nr. 73
  - II.Bataillon/Lothringisches Fußartillerie-Regiment Nr. 16
- Stab Pionier-Bataillon Nr. 134
  - 3.Kompanie/Masurisches Pionier-Bataillon Nr. 26
  - Pionier-Kompanie Nr. 250
  - Minenwerfer-Kompanie Nr. 37
- Divisions-Nachrichten-Kommandeur 37
