= Oskar von Hutier =

German general during the First World War

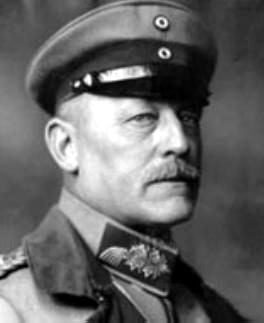
- Born: 27 August 1857; Erfurt, Province of Saxony, Kingdom of Prussia, German Confederation
- Died: 5 December 1934 (aged 77); Berlin, Nazi Germany
- Military career
- Allegiance: German Empire
- Branch: Imperial German Army
- Service years: 1875–1919
- Rank: General der Infanterie
- Conflicts: World War I
- Awards: Pour le Mérite

Oskar Emil von Hutier (27 August 1857 – 5 December 1934) was a German general during the First World War. He served in the German Army from 1875 to 1919, including war service.

During the First World War, he commanded the army that took Riga in 1917. The following year he was transferred to the Western Front to participate in Operation Michael that year. He is frequently but mistakenly credited with having created the stormtrooper tactics of small, rapid forces, which he employed to great effect during the Michael offensive. These tactics had been developed by other officers on the Western Front before he was reassigned there.

After retiring from the Army in 1919, Hutier presided over the German Officers' League until his death on 5 December 1934. He was among leaders who contended that the Army had been betrayed by enemies at home.

== Biography ==
Oskar von Hutier was born in Erfurt on 27 August 1857, in the Prussian Province of Saxony. His family had a long tradition of military service; his grandfather served in the French Army and his father, Cölestin von Hutier, rose to the rank of colonel in the Prussian Army. Hutier was commissioned into the German Army in 1874 and attended the Prussian Military Academy beginning in 1885. There, he gained the attention of the General Staff, on which he subsequently served. He served as the Oberquartiermeister in 1911.

Hutier married Fanni Ludendorff, and had three children. Their son Oskar was seriously wounded at the Battle of Verdun in 1916.

=== World War I ===
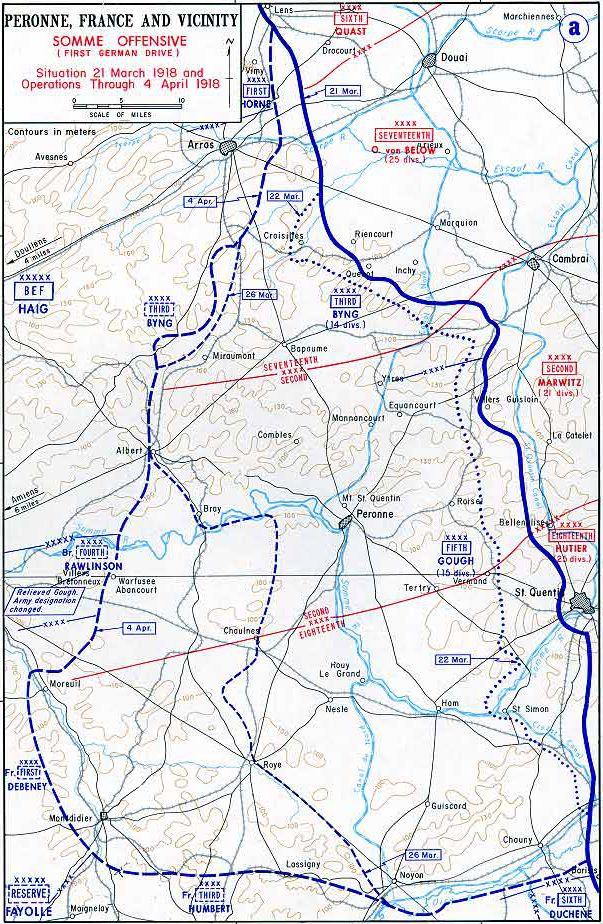
Map of German advance during Operation Michael, with Hutier's 18th Army, in the southern third, having the farthest advances

Hutier spent the first year of the First World War as a divisional commander in France. There, he commanded the 1st Guards Infantry Division in the Second Army. He commanded the unit during the First Battle of the Marne, and remained on the Western Front until April 1915, when he was transferred to the Eastern Front. There, on 4 April, he took command of the XXI Corps of the Tenth Army. He briefly commanded the Army Detachment D from 2 January to 22 April in 1917. On 22 April, he was promoted to General der Infanterie (General of the Infantry) and placed in command of the Eighth Army.

On 3 September 1917, Hutier, commanding the Eighth Army, ended the two-year siege of the Russian city of Riga. He moved his troops to an unexpected sector in the Russian lines, and using a heavy bombardment prepared by Georg Bruchmüller and a surprise crossing of the Dvina River, took the city. The tactics he employed—surprise and encirclement—were essentially standard German Army doctrine; his infantry attacked in company-strength skirmish lines after crossing the River Dvina, much as they would have done in 1914. He followed this success with Operation Albion, an amphibious assault (the only successful one of the war) that seized Russian-held islands in the Baltic Sea. Hutier was awarded the Pour le Mérite by Kaiser Wilhelm II for seizing Riga. His success there also impressed General Erich Ludendorff, who transferred Hutier to the Western Front in 1918.

After arriving on the Western Front, Hutier was placed in command of the newly formed Eighteenth Army. In March 1918, during Operation Michael at the start of the German spring offensive, Hutier employed the new infiltration tactics that had been developed over the preceding three years on the Western Front. He hammered the British Fifth Army, advancing some 40 miles along the Somme River toward Amiens in the span of fifteen days. Hutier's forces captured around 50,000 prisoners; Hutier was awarded the Oak Leaves to accompany his Pour le Mérite for this victory. A contemporary French magazine credited Hutier with creating these infiltration tactics, which relied on small, flexible forces that moved rapidly, calling them "Hutier tactics", though he had had no significant role in developing them.

Later in June, Hutier directed an offensive toward Noyon, which made initial gains but broke down in the face of stiff Allied resistance. For the rest of the war, Hutier's Eighteenth Army fought on the defensive while the Allies launched a strategic counter-offensive that culminated in Germany's total defeat by November.

=== Later life ===
Following the Armistice in November 1918, Hutier marched his Army back to Germany, where he was greeted as a hero. He retired from the army in 1919. Like his overall commander and cousin, Ludendorff, Hutier long maintained that the German Army had not been defeated in the field, but was "stabbed in the back" by domestic enemies on the home front. Hutier served as president of the German Officers' League from 1919 to shortly before his death in Berlin on 5 December 1934, at the age of 77.

== Decorations and awards ==
- Pour le Mérite with Oak Leaves
- Order of the Red Eagle, 2nd class with Crown and Star
- Order of the Crown, 2nd class (Prussia)
- Iron Cross of 1914, 1st and 2nd class
- Service Award (Prussia)
- Commander Second Class of the Order of the Zähringer Lion (Baden)
- Military Merit Order, 2nd class with Star (Bavaria)
- Knight's Cross, First Class of the Ludwig Order (Hesse-Darmstadt)
- Grand Cross of the Order of Philip the Magnanimous (Hesse-Darmstadt)
- Commander of the Order of the Griffon (Mecklenburg-Schwerin)
- Commander of the House and Merit Order of Peter Frederick Louis (Oldenburg)
- Grand Cross of the Albert Order (Saxony)
- Commander Second Class of the Ducal Saxe-Ernestine House Order
- Grand Cross of the Order of the Dannebrog (Denmark)
- Knight Grand Cross of the Royal Victorian Order (United Kingdom)
- Commander of the Order of Orange-Nassau (Netherlands)

== Citations ==
Military offices
Preceded by General der Infanterie Fritz von Below	Commander, XXI Corps; 4 April 1915 – 2 January 1917	Succeeded by Generalleutnant Ernst von Oven
Preceded by General der Artillerie Friedrich von Scholtz	Commander, Armee-Abteilung D 2 January 1917 – 22 April 1917	Succeeded by General der Infanterie Günther Graf von Kirchbach
Preceded by General der Artillerie Friedrich von Scholtz	Commander, 8th Army; 22 April 1917 – 12 December 1917	Succeeded by General der Infanterie Günther Graf von Kirchbach
Preceded by New Formation	Commander, 18th Army; 22 December 1917 – 2 January 1919	Succeeded by Dissolved
