= Günther von Kirchbach =

Prussian general (1850–1925)

Günther Emanuel Graf von Kirchbach
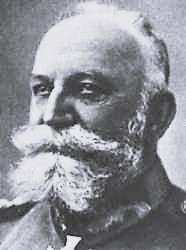
- Born: 9 August 1850; Erfurt, Thuringia, Germany
- Died: 6 November 1925 (aged 75); Bad Blankenburg, Thuringia, Germany
- Relatives: Hugo von Kirchbach
- Military career
- Allegiance: (Kingdom of Prussia) Prussia (German Empire) Imperial Germany
- Branch: Prussian Army; German Imperial Army
- Service years: 1868–1919
- Rank: Generaloberst
- Commands: 2nd Foot Guards; 71st Infantry Brigade; 17th Division; V Corps; X Reserve Corps; Landwehr Corps; Armee-Abteilung D; 8th Army; Heeresgruppe Kiev
- Conflicts: Franco-Prussian War; First World War
- Awards: Pour le Mérite; Order of the Black Eagle

Günther Emanuel Graf von Kirchbach (9 August 1850 – 6 November 1925) was a German Generaloberst who served during the First World War.

== Biography ==
Günther von Kirchbach was born in Erfurt in 1850, the son of Hugo von Kirchbach. He entered the Prussian army in April 1868 as a second lieutenant in the Garde-Füsilier-Regiment and served with this regiment in the Franco-Prussian War of 1870. He married Adda Freiin von Liliencron in 1883. By 1899 Kirchbach had been promoted to Generalmajor. In 1903 he was promoted to Generalleutnant and in 1907 to General der Infanterie. From 1908 to 1911 he was commanding officer of V Corps, a command his father had previously held during the Franco-Prussian War. Kirchbach's last position before the First World War broke out was as President of the Military Tribunal.

On the outbreak of the war in August 1914, Kirchbach was given command of X Reserve Corps which served as part of the 2nd Army on the Western front. On 29 August 1914 Kirchbach was wounded on active service and hospitalized. Relieved of his command due to his injuries, he resumed his former post as head of the Military Tribunal. In September 1916 Kirchbach was given command of the Landwehr Corps. He was given command of Army group Woyrsch in November 1916. In April 1917 Kirchbach was given command of Armee-Abteilung D. In December 1917 he was given command of the 8th Army fighting in the Baltic states. In August 1918 he succeeded Generalfeldmarschall Hermann von Eichhorn as commander of Heeresgruppe Kiew. Kirchbach held this position until 5 February 1919, when he was retired by the new government.

== Glossary ==
- Armee-Abteilung or Army Detachment in the sense of "something detached from an Army". It is not under the command of an Army so is in itself a small Army.
- Armee-Gruppe or Army Group in the sense of a group within an Army and under its command, generally formed as a temporary measure for a specific task.
- Heeresgruppe or Army Group in the sense of a number of armies under a single commander.

== Orders and decorations ==
- Kingdom of Prussia: Knight of Honour of the Johanniter Order, 1893; Knight of Justice, 1898

== Bibliography ==
- Cron, Hermann (2002). Imperial German Army 1914-18: Organisation, Structure, Orders-of-Battle [first published: 1937]. Helion & Co. ISBN 1-874622-70-1.

Military offices
| Preceded by General der Infanterie Alexander von Kluck | Commander, V Corps; 11 September 1907 – 3 April 1911 | Succeeded by General der Infanterie Hermann von Strantz |
| Preceded by New formation | Commander, X Reserve Corps; 2–30 August 1914 | Succeeded by General der Infanterie Johannes von Eben |
| Preceded by General der Infanterie Remus von Woyrsch | Commander, Landwehr Corps; 23 September 1916 – 23 April 1917 | Succeeded by General der Infanterie Artur von Brietzke |
| Preceded by General der Infanterie Oskar von Hutier | Commander, Armee-Abteilung D 22 April – 12 December 1917 | Succeeded by General der Artillerie Hans von Kirchbach |
| Preceded by General der Infanterie Oskar von Hutier | Commander, 8th Army; 12 December 1917 – 31 July 1918 | Succeeded by General der Infanterie Hugo von Kathen |
| Preceded by Generalfeldmarschall Hermann von Eichhorn | Commander, Heeresgruppe Kiew; 31 July 1918 – 9 February 1919 | Succeeded by Dissolved |
