= Hugo von Kathen =

German infantry general

Hugo Karl Gottlieb von Kathen
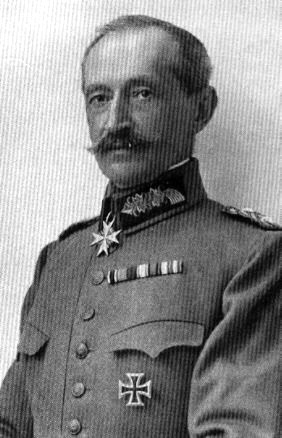
- Born: 27 August 1855; Freienwalde, Prussia
- Died: 2 April 1932 (aged 76); Wiesbaden, Weimar Germany
- Military career
- Allegiance: German Empire
- Branch: Prussian Army
- Service years: 1873–1918
- Rank: General
- Commands: 74th (1st Hannover) Infantry; 83rd Infantry Brigade; 9th Division; 39th Division; XXIII Reserve Corps; 8th Army
- Conflicts: World War I
- Awards: Pour le Mérite with Oakleaves

Hugo Karl Gottlieb von Kathen (27 August 1855 – 2 April 1932) was a German infantry general during World War I.

== Family ==
Kathen was born in Freienwalde, Farther Pomerania to the Prussian Major Karl von Kathen (1803–1876) (a landowner from Langenhaken in Pomerania), and Agnes née Schumann (1825–1895). His family came originally from Stralsund, and they became Swedish nobility in 1692.

Kathen married Susanne von Dechend (1859–1929), daughter of Reichsbank president Hermann von Dechend (1814–1890), on 27 September 1884 in Berlin.

Kathen died in Wiesbaden, Hesse.

== Commands held ==
- 2 August - 18 December 1914: military governor of Mainz
- 19 December 1914 - 30 July 1918: commanding general of the XXIII Reserve Corps
- 31 July - 11 November 1918: commander-in-chief of the 8th army
- until February 1919: commander of the German troops in Lithuania and Estonia
- starting from February 1919: commander of the German troops in Latvia

== Medals and decoration ==
- Pour le Mérite on 28 August 1916; with oak leaves on 27 August 1917

Military offices
Preceded by General der Kavallerie Georg von Kleist	Commander, XXIII Reserve Corps; 19 December 1914-31 July 1918	Succeeded by Generalleutnant Arthur von Gabain
Preceded by Generaloberst Günther Graf von Kirchbach	Commander, 8th Army; 31 July 1918-21 January 1919	Succeeded by Dissolved
