= XX Corps (German Empire) =

XX Army Corps XX. Armee-Korps
- Flag of the Staff of a Generalkommando (1871–1918)
- Active: 1 October 1912–1919
- Country: German Empire
- Type: Corps
- Size: Approximately 44,000 (on mobilisation in 1914)
- Garrison/HQ: Allenstein/Kopernikus-Platz 3
- Shoulder strap piping: Light Blue
- Engagements: World War I Battle of Gumbinnen Battle of Tannenberg (1914) First Battle of the Masurian Lakes Battle of the Vistula River

The XX Army Corps / XX AK (German: XX. Armee-Korps) was a corps level command of the German Army before and during World War I.

As the German Army expanded in the later part of the 19th century and early part of the 20th century, the XX Army Corps was set up on 1 October 1912 in Allenstein as the Generalkommando (headquarters) for the southern part of East Prussia. It took over command of 37th Division from I Corps and the newly formed 41st Division. General der Artillerie Friedrich von Scholtz, former commander of 21st Division, took command. It was assigned to the I Army Inspectorate. which became the 8th Army at the start of the First World War.

XX Corps served on the Eastern Front from the start of the war. In September 1915, the corps was upgraded to form Armee-Gruppe Scholtz, later Armee-Abteilung Scholtz, as part of the Army of the Niemen. It was reformed from Armee-Abteilung D in September 1918. It was dissolved after the war.

== Peacetime organisation ==
The 25 peacetime Corps of the German Army (Guards, I - XXI, I - III Bavarian) had a reasonably standardised organisation. Each consisted of two divisions with usually two infantry brigades, one field artillery brigade and a cavalry brigade each. Each brigade normally consisted of two regiments of the appropriate type, so each Corps normally commanded 8 infantry, 4 field artillery and 4 cavalry regiments. There were exceptions to this rule:

V, VI, VII, IX and XIV Corps each had a 5th infantry brigade (so 10 infantry regiments)
II, XIII, XVIII and XXI Corps had a 9th infantry regiment
I, VI and XVI Corps had a 3rd cavalry brigade (so 6 cavalry regiments)
the Guards Corps had 11 infantry regiments (in 5 brigades) and 8 cavalry regiments (in 4 brigades).

Each Corps also directly controlled a number of other units. This could include one or more

Foot Artillery Regiment
Jäger Battalion
Pioneer Battalion
Train Battalion

Peacetime organization of the Corps
| Corps | Division | Brigade | Units | Garrison |
|---|---|---|---|---|
| XX Corps | 37th Division | 73rd Infantry Brigade | 147th (2nd Masurian) Infantry | Lyck, III Bn at Lötzen |
| XX Corps | 37th Division | 73rd Infantry Brigade | 151st (2nd Ermland) Infantry | Sensburg, III Bn at Bischofsburg |
| XX Corps | 37th Division | 75th Infantry Brigade | 146th (1st Masurian) Infantry | Allenstein |
| XX Corps | 37th Division | 75th Infantry Brigade | 150th (1st Ermland) Infantry | Allenstein |
| XX Corps | 37th Division | 37th Field Artillery Brigade | 73rd (1st Masurian) Field Artillery | Allenstein |
| XX Corps | 37th Division | 37th Field Artillery Brigade | 82nd (2nd Masurian) Field Artillery | Rastenburg, Lötzen |
| XX Corps | 37th Division | 37th Cavalry Brigade | 10th (East Prussian) Dragoons "King Albert of Saxony" | Allenstein |
| XX Corps | 37th Division | 37th Cavalry Brigade | 11th (Pomeranian) Dragoons "von Wedel" | Lyck |
| XX Corps | 41st Division | 72nd Infantry Brigade | 18th (1st Posen) Infantry "von Grolman" | Osterode |
| XX Corps | 41st Division | 72nd Infantry Brigade | 59th (4th Posen) Infantry "Baron Hiller von Gaertringen" | Deutsch-Eylau, Soldau |
| XX Corps | 41st Division | 74th Infantry Brigade | 148th (5th West Prussian) Infantry | Elbing, III Bn at Braunsberg |
| XX Corps | 41st Division | 74th Infantry Brigade | 152nd (1st Alsasian) Infantry "Teutonic Order" | Marienburg, III Bn at Stuhm |
| XX Corps | 41st Division | 41st Field Artillery Brigade | 35th (1st West Prussian) Field Artillery | Deutsch-Eylau |
| XX Corps | 41st Division | 41st Field Artillery Brigade | 79th (3rd East Prussian) Field Artillery | Osterode |
| XX Corps | 41st Division | 41st Cavalry Brigade | 5th (West Prussian) Cuirassiers "Duke Frederick Eugene of Württemberg" | Riesenburg |
| XX Corps | 41st Division | 41st Cavalry Brigade | 4th (1st Pomeranian) Uhlans "von Schmidt" | Thorn |
| XX Corps | Corps Troops | | 1st (East Prussian) Jäger Battalion "Graf Yorck von Wartenberg" | Ortelsburg |
| XX Corps | Corps Troops | | 2nd Fortress Machine Gun Abteilung | Lötzen (Fortress Boyen) |
| XX Corps | Corps Troops | | 23rd (2nd West Prussian) (Fortress-)Pioneer Battalion | Graudenz |
| XX Corps | Corps Troops | | 26th (Masurian) Pioneer Battalion | Graudenz |
| XX Corps | Corps Troops | | 20th (Masurian) Train Battalion | Marienburg |
| XX Corps | Allenstein Defence Command (Landwehr-Inspektion) | | | Allenstein |

== World War I ==
=== Organisation on mobilisation ===
On mobilization on 2 August 1914 the Corps was restructured. 41st Cavalry Brigade was withdrawn to form part of the 1st Cavalry Division and the 37th Cavalry Brigade was broken up and its regiments assigned to the divisions as reconnaissance units. Divisions received engineer companies and other support units from the Corps headquarters. In summary, XX Corps mobilised with 25 infantry battalions, 9 machine gun companies (54 machine guns), 8 cavalry squadrons, 24 field artillery batteries (144 guns), 4 heavy artillery batteries (16 guns), 3 pioneer companies and an aviation detachment.

Initial wartime organization of the Corps
| Corps | Division | Brigade | Units |
|---|---|---|---|
| XX Corps | 37th Division | 73rd Infantry Brigade | 147th Infantry Regiment |
| XX Corps | 37th Division | 73rd Infantry Brigade | 151st Infantry Regiment |
| XX Corps | 37th Division | 73rd Infantry Brigade | 1st Jäger Battalion |
| XX Corps | 37th Division | 75th Infantry Brigade | 146th Infantry Regiment |
| XX Corps | 37th Division | 75th Infantry Brigade | 150th Infantry Regiment |
| XX Corps | 37th Division | 37th Field Artillery Brigade | 73rd Field Artillery Regiment |
| XX Corps | 37th Division | 37th Field Artillery Brigade | 82nd Field Artillery Regiment |
| XX Corps | 37th Division | | 11th Dragoon Regiment |
| XX Corps | 37th Division | | 1st Company, 26th Pioneer Battalion |
| XX Corps | 37th Division | | 37th Divisional Pontoon Train |
| XX Corps | 37th Division | | 1st Medical Company |
| XX Corps | 41st Division | 72nd Infantry Brigade | 18th Infantry Regiment |
| XX Corps | 41st Division | 72nd Infantry Brigade | 59th Infantry Regiment |
| XX Corps | 41st Division | 74th Infantry Brigade | 148th Infantry Regiment |
| XX Corps | 41st Division | 74th Infantry Brigade | 152nd Infantry Regiment |
| XX Corps | 41st Division | 41st Field Artillery Brigade | 35th Field Artillery Regiment |
| XX Corps | 41st Division | 41st Field Artillery Brigade | 79th Field Artillery Regiment |
| XX Corps | 41st Division | | 10th Dragoon Regiment |
| XX Corps | 41st Division | | 2nd Company, 26th Pioneer Battalion |
| XX Corps | 41st Division | | 3rd Company, 26th Pioneer Battalion |
| XX Corps | 41st Division | | 41st Divisional Pontoon Train |
| XX Corps | 41st Division | | 2nd Medical Company |
| XX Corps | 41st Division | | 3rd Medical Company |
| XX Corps | Corps Troops | | II Battalion, 5th Foot Artillery Regiment |
| XX Corps | Corps Troops | | 15th Aviation Detachment |
| XX Corps | Corps Troops | | 20th Corps Pontoon Train |
| XX Corps | Corps Troops | | 20th Telephone Detachment |
| XX Corps | Corps Troops | | 26th Pioneer Searchlight Section |
| XX Corps | Corps Troops | | Munition Trains and Columns corresponding to II Corps |

=== Combat chronicle ===
On mobilisation, XX Corps was assigned to the 8th Army to defend East Prussia while the rest of the Army executed the Schlieffen Plan offensive in August 1914. It took part in the battles of Gumbinnen, Tannenberg and 1st Masurian Lakes. Immediately after 1st Masurian Lakes it joined 9th Army in Lower Silesia where it fought at the Battle of the Vistula River. By May 1915 it was back with 8th Army and on 26 May the commander of XX Corps, General der Artillerie Friedrich von Scholtz, was made commander of the Army, while retaining simultaneous command of his Corps. On 29 September 1915, the headquarters of 8th Army was dissolved. On 18 September 1915, XX Corps was upgraded to form Armee-Gruppe Scholtz, later Armee-Abteilung Scholtz, as part of the Army of the Niemen.

XX Corps was reformed from Armee-Abteilung D on 21 September 1918.

== Commanders ==
The XX Corps had the following commanders during its existence:

| Dates | Name | Notes |
|---|---|---|
| 1 October 1912 to 28 October 1915 | General der Artillerie Friedrich von Scholtz | Headquarters upgraded to Armee-Abteilung Scholtz |
| 21 September 1918 to end of war | Generalleutnant Viktor Albrecht | Headquarters reformed from Armee-Abteilung D |

== Glossary ==
- Armee-Abteilung or Army Detachment in the sense of "something detached from an Army". It is not under the command of an Army so is in itself a small Army.
- Armee-Gruppe or Army Group in the sense of a group within an Army and under its command, generally formed as a temporary measure for a specific task.
- Heeresgruppe or Army Group in the sense of a number of armies under a single commander.

== See also ==
- Armee-Abteilung D
- German Army order of battle (1914)
- Order of battle at Tannenberg
- List of Imperial German infantry regiments
- List of Imperial German artillery regiments
- List of Imperial German cavalry regiments

== Bibliography ==
- Cron, Hermann (2002). Imperial German Army 1914-18: Organisation, Structure, Orders-of-Battle [first published: 1937]. Helion & Co. ISBN 1-874622-70-1.
- Ellis, John; Cox, Michael (1993). The World War I Databook. Aurum Press Ltd. ISBN 1-85410-766-6.
- Haythornthwaite, Philip J. (1996). The World War One Source Book. Arms and Armour. ISBN 1-85409-351-7.
- Histories of Two Hundred and Fifty-One Divisions of the German Army which Participated in the War (1914-1918), compiled from records of Intelligence section of the General Staff, American Expeditionary Forces, at General Headquarters, Chaumont, France 1919. The London Stamp Exchange Ltd. 1989 [1920]. ISBN 0-948130-87-3.
- The German Forces in the Field; 7th Revision, 11th November 1918; Compiled by the General Staff, War Office. Imperial War Museum, London and the Battery Press. 1995 [1918]. ISBN 978-1-870423-95-3.
