= Theodor Geib =

German general during World War II

Theodor Geib (15 September 1885 Landau, Palatinate – 26 November 1944) was a German general in Albania during World War II.

Rather than appoint a military governor to oversee Albania, Germany appointed Geib as "German General in Albania" (DGA) with the official duty "to represent the interests of the Wehrmacht to the "Albanian government".

== Life ==
=== Origin & Family ===
Theodor Geib was the son of the railway administrator Phillip Jakob Geib (1854-1909) and Auguste Frantz (1856-1939). Auguste Frantz was the daughter of Freidrich Theodor Frantz (1809-1864), who was a pastor, author, editor of a Protestant newspaper and involved in the German Revolution of 1849.

Geib was married to Alma Maria Wieselhuber, with whom he had a son, Joachim (1927-1992). Joachim was born in Kassel before eventually emigrating to the United States.

== Career ==
Geib joined the 2nd Foot Artillery Regiment of the Bavarian Army on 15 July 1904 as a cadet. After completing study at the Munich War School, he was promoted to Lieutenant in early March 1906. In 1908-1910, he attended the artillery and engineering school for further education. Upon the commencement of the First World War, Geib became a Lieutenant in the replacement battalion. On 10 August 1914 he was appointed as the commander of a battery in the 2nd Foot Artillery Regiment. At the start of September that same year, he was promoted to the regimental staff as the orderly officer. During his service in France, he was involved in battles in Lorraine, the Marne, and the Aisne.

On 6 October 1915 he rose to Adjutant of the General of Foot Artillery in the III Army Corps and was subsequently promoted to Captain in mid-May 1916. From 16 November 1916 to 27 February 1917 Geib returned to the 2nd Foot Artillery Regiment and resumed his position as a battery commander. He was then moved to the role of adjuant to the artillery commander of the 12th Infantry Division during the campaign in Romania. Following the Focșani armistice on 9 March 1918, he was transferred to the staff of General der Artillerie I at the Grand Headquarters.

Theodor Geib was awarded both classes of the Iron Cross and the Military Order of Merit IV Class with Swords in 1881. After the end of the war, he returned to his main regiment on 8 January 1919. After the demobilisation and dissolution of the association, he was then taken over by the Reichswehr, working as an adjuant at the Grafenwoehr Training Area Command before joining the Cuxhaven Command in June 1921 and transferred to the Wilhelmshaven Command four months later. On 1 April 1923 Geib was made company commander of the 4th (Bavarian) Squadron of the 4th Driving Department in Landsberg am Lech. On 1 March 1925 he moved to the staff of the 2nd Department of the 7th (Bavarian) Artillery Regiment, before being promoted to major in February 1927, when he transferred to the staff of Group Command 2 in Kassel. In June 1929, he moved to the Army Weapons Office in the Reich Ministry of Defence in Berlin. Here, he also worked in the Army Supply Department.

Whilst in Berlin, he resided in Johanna-Stegen-Strasse 17, in Steglitz.

At the beginning of April 1934 Geib was appointed Chief of Staff for Field Equipment Inspection at the General Army Office. One year later he was made Head of the Field Equipment Inspection Department and in 1937, the Army Field Equipment Master with the position of Field Equipment Inspector with Wolfgang von Kluge as Chief of his staff. In early 1942, he was promoted to the rank of General der Artillerie.

From 17 August to 7 September 1943 he was in the Führerreserve. Following the Italian armistice, Geib was appointed military commander for Albania and Montenegro, as well as German plenipotentiary general in Albania - later replaced by Otto Gullman in 1944. He reported directly to the Chief of the High Command of the Wehrmacht, Wilhelm Keitel. During this tenure in office, Geib also served as Field Commander Cetinje from 15 September 1943 to 31 May 1944, as well as German Plenipotentiary General in Montenegro from 15 April to 31 May 1944. In November 1943 he was awarded the German Cross in Silver.

In June 1944, he was again transferred to the Führerreserve where he succeeded Heinrich Niehoff as commander of the army area of southern France. On 30 July 1944, during his journey to his new role, an attack by French partisans took place near Chalon-sur-Saône, ultimately leading to his death a few days later. He was subsequently replaced by Ernst Dehner.

== Sources ==
- Fischer, Bernd Jürgen (1999). Albania at War, 1939-1945. C. Hurst & Co. Publishers. ISBN 978-1-85065-531-2.
- Elsie, Robert (2013). A Biographical Dictionary of Albanian History. I.B.Tauris. ISBN 978-1-78076-431-3.
