= XII (Royal Saxon) Reserve Corps =

XII (Royal Saxon) Reserve Corps XII. (Königlich Sächsisches) Reserve-Korps
- Flag of the Staff of a Generalkommando (1871–1918)
- Active: 2 August 1914–1919
- Country: Kingdom of Saxony / German Empire
- Type: Corps
- Size: Approximately 38,000 (on formation)
- Engagements: World War I Battle of the Frontiers

The XII (Royal Saxon) Reserve Corps (German: XII. (Königlich Sächsisches) Reserve-Korps / XII RK) was a corps level command of the German Army in World War I.

== Formation ==
XII Reserve Corps was formed on the outbreak of the war in August 1914 as part of the mobilisation of the Army. It was initially commanded by General der Artillerie Hans von Kirchbach, recalled from retirement. It was still in existence at the end of the war in Armee-Abteilung C, Heeresgruppe Gallwitz on the Western Front.

=== Structure on formation ===
On formation in August 1914, XII Reserve Corps consisted of two divisions, made up of reserve units. In general, Reserve Corps and Reserve Divisions were weaker than their active counterparts

Reserve Infantry Regiments did not always have three battalions nor necessarily contain a machine gun company
Reserve Jäger Battalions did not have a machine gun company on formation
Reserve Cavalry Regiments consisted of just three squadrons
Reserve Field Artillery Regiments usually consisted of two abteilungen of three batteries each, though the Reserve Field Artillery Regiments of XII Corps had three abteilungen
Corps Troops generally consisted of a Telephone Detachment and four sections of munition columns and trains

In summary, XII Reserve Corps mobilised with 26 infantry battalions, 6 machine gun companies (36 machine guns), 6 cavalry squadrons, 18 field artillery batteries (108 guns) and 3 pioneer companies.

24th Reserve Division was formed by units drawn from the XIX Corps District.

Corps	Division	Brigade	Units
XII (Royal Saxon) Reserve Corps	23rd Reserve Division	45th Reserve Infantry Brigade	100th Reserve Infantry Regiment
XII (Royal Saxon) Reserve Corps	23rd Reserve Division	45th Reserve Infantry Brigade	101st Reserve Infantry Regiment
XII (Royal Saxon) Reserve Corps	23rd Reserve Division	45th Reserve Infantry Brigade	12th Reserve Jäger Battalion
XII (Royal Saxon) Reserve Corps	23rd Reserve Division	46th Reserve Infantry Brigade	102nd Reserve Infantry Regiment
XII (Royal Saxon) Reserve Corps	23rd Reserve Division	46th Reserve Infantry Brigade	103rd Reserve Infantry Regiment
XII (Royal Saxon) Reserve Corps	23rd Reserve Division		Saxon Reserve Hussar Regiment
XII (Royal Saxon) Reserve Corps	23rd Reserve Division		23rd Reserve Field Artillery Regiment
XII (Royal Saxon) Reserve Corps	23rd Reserve Division		4th Company, 12th Pioneer Battalion
XII (Royal Saxon) Reserve Corps	23rd Reserve Division		23rd Reserve Divisional Pontoon Train
XII (Royal Saxon) Reserve Corps	23rd Reserve Division		1st Saxon Reserve Medical Company
XII (Royal Saxon) Reserve Corps	24th Reserve Division	47th Reserve Infantry Brigade	104th Reserve Infantry Regiment
XII (Royal Saxon) Reserve Corps	24th Reserve Division	47th Reserve Infantry Brigade	106th Reserve Infantry Regiment
XII (Royal Saxon) Reserve Corps	24th Reserve Division	47th Reserve Infantry Brigade	13th Reserve Jäger Battalion
XII (Royal Saxon) Reserve Corps	24th Reserve Division	48th Reserve Infantry Brigade	107th Reserve Infantry Regiment
XII (Royal Saxon) Reserve Corps	24th Reserve Division	48th Reserve Infantry Brigade	133rd Reserve Infantry Regiment
XII (Royal Saxon) Reserve Corps	24th Reserve Division		Saxon Reserve Uhlan Regiment
XII (Royal Saxon) Reserve Corps	24th Reserve Division		24th Reserve Field Artillery Regiment
XII (Royal Saxon) Reserve Corps	24th Reserve Division		1st Reserve Company, 12th Pioneer Battalion
XII (Royal Saxon) Reserve Corps	24th Reserve Division		2nd Reserve Company, 12th Pioneer Battalion
XII (Royal Saxon) Reserve Corps	24th Reserve Division		2nd Saxon Reserve Medical Company
XII (Royal Saxon) Reserve Corps	Corps Troops		12th Reserve Telephone Detachment
XII (Royal Saxon) Reserve Corps	Corps Troops		Munition Trains and Columns corresponding to the III Reserve Corps

== Combat chronicle ==
On mobilisation, XII Reserve Corps was assigned to the predominantly Saxon 3rd Army on the right wing of the forces that invaded France as part of the Schlieffen Plan offensive in August 1914.

== Commanders ==
XII Reserve Corps had the following commanders during its existence:

From	Rank	Name
2 August 1914	General der Artillerie	Hans von Kirchbach
15 December 1917	General der Infanterie	Horst Edler von der Planitz
24 July 1918	Generalleutnant	Max Leuthold

== See also ==
- German Army order of battle (1914)
- German Army order of battle, Western Front (1918)

== Bibliography ==
- Cron, Hermann (2002). Imperial German Army 1914-18: Organisation, Structure, Orders-of-Battle [first published: 1937]. Helion & Co. ISBN 1-874622-70-1.
- Ellis, John; Cox, Michael (1993). The World War I Databook. Aurum Press Ltd. ISBN 1-85410-766-6.
- Histories of Two Hundred and Fifty-One Divisions of the German Army which Participated in the War (1914-1918), compiled from records of Intelligence section of the General Staff, American Expeditionary Forces, at General Headquarters, Chaumont, France 1919. The London Stamp Exchange Ltd. 1989 [1920]. ISBN 0-948130-87-3.
- The German Forces in the Field; 7th Revision, 11th November 1918; Compiled by the General Staff, War Office. Imperial War Museum, London and the Battery Press. 1995 [1918]. ISBN 978-1-870423-95-3.
