= Hans von Kirchbach =

Royal Saxon army officer

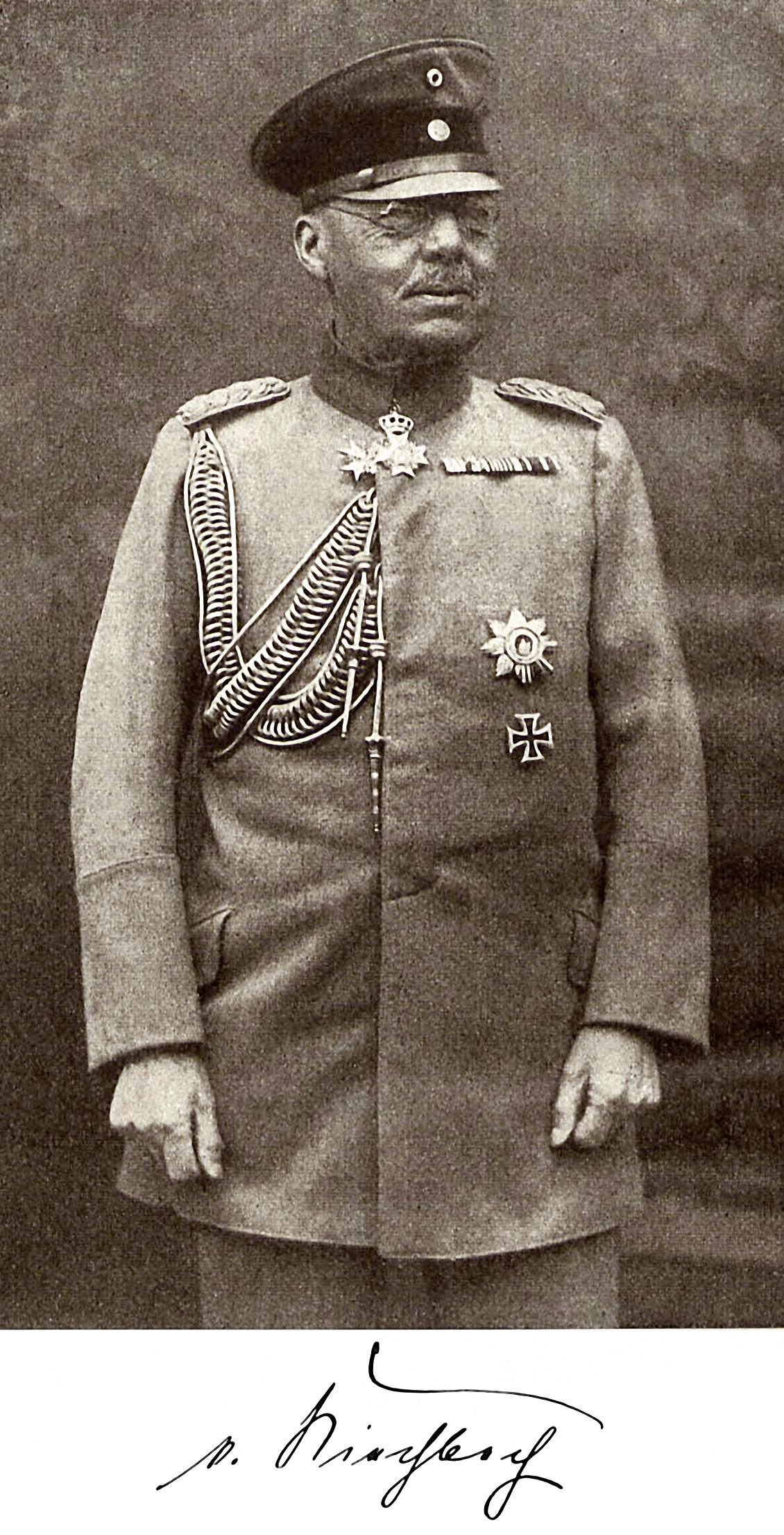
- Born: 22 June 1849; Auerbach, Kingdom of Saxony
- Died: 23 July 1928 (aged 79); Dresden, Germany
- Burial place: Nordfriedhof, Dresden
- Military career
- Allegiance: Kingdom of Saxony; German Empire
- Branch: (Kingdom of Saxony) Saxon Army; Imperial German Army
- Service years: 1863–1918
- Rank: Generaloberst
- Commands: 32nd (3rd Royal Saxon) Field Artillery; 40th (4th Royal Saxon) Field Artillery Brigade; 23rd (1st Royal Saxon) Field Artillery Brigade; 32nd (3rd Royal Saxon) Division; XIX (2nd Royal Saxon) Corps; XII (Royal Saxon) Reserve Corps; Armee-Abteilung D
- Conflicts: Austro-Prussian War; Franco-Prussian War; World War I
- Awards: Pour le Mérite

Rudolph Bodo Hans von Kirchbach (born 22 June 1849 in Auerbach (Vogtland) – died 23 July 1928 in Dresden) was a Royal Saxon army officer who was a Generaloberst in the First World War and awarded the Pour le Mérite.

== Life and military career ==
He came from the Saxon nobility. Kirchbach and was the son of the Oberland Forest Master Carl von Kirchbach (1799–1893), Privy Council of Finance and Saxon royal chamberlain, and his second wife Josephine von Bodenhausen (1825–1898).

Kirchbach attended private school in Auerbach and the higher secondary school of Bezzenberger and Opelt in Dresden. He joined the army on 1 April 1863, at the age of 14 years, spending 3 years as a cadet in the Royal Saxon Artillery School in Dresden. In May 1866, Kirchbach was assigned to the 19th (2nd Royal Saxon) Foot Artillery and with this regiment took park in the Austro-Prussian War. He was promoted in July 1866 to the rank of second lieutenant and in August joined the 12th (1st Royal Saxon) Field Artillery. He served with this regiment in the Franco-Prussian War and won the Iron Cross (1870).

In 1872, he was promoted to first lieutenant and captain in 1877. Between 1878 and 1881 he served as a regimental and brigade adjutant and as adjutant to the King Albert of Saxony. In 1881, he was appointed battery commander in the 19th (2nd Royal Saxon) Foot Artillery Regiment. He served from 1884 to 1889 as an instructor at the Artillery and Engineering School in Berlin, gaining promotion to major in 1887. In 1889 he returned to the 12th (1st Royal Saxon) Field Artillery Regiment as commander of the 1st Abteilung (equivalent to Battalion). There, in 1891, he was promoted to the rank of lieutenant colonel. Kirchbach was transferred to the Saxon War Department in 1893, and became a colonel in 1895, when he was placed in command of the 32nd (3rd Royal Saxon) Field Artillery Regiment. In 1899, now a Generalmajor, he was commander of the 40th (4th Royal Saxon) Field Artillery Brigade, and in 1901, commander of the 23rd (1st Royal Saxon) Field Artillery Brigade. In 1904 Kirchbach was promoted to Generalleutnant and appointed commander of the 32nd (3rd Royal Saxon) Division.

In 1907 he was appointed General der Artillerie and commanding general of the XIX (2nd Royal Saxon) Corps. Thus, he held one of the three highest positions in the Saxon army during peacetime. Kirchbach received this post even though he had not previously held a general staff position. King Frederick Augustus III of Saxony appointed him in 1912 "à la suite" of the 32nd (3rd Royal Saxon) Field Artillery Regiment. After nearly six years as corps commander, Kirchbach retired at the end of November 1913.

== World War I ==
Within months of retirement, the First World War broke out. Kirchbach was reactivated and was assigned as the commanding general of the XII (Royal Saxon) Reserve Corps, part of the predominantly Saxon 3rd Army on the right wing of the forces that invaded France as part of the Schlieffen Plan offensive in August 1914. He served with this corps on the Western Front over the next three years. He fought in 1914 in the First Battle of the Marne, in 1915 in the First Battle of Champagne, in 1916 in the Battle of the Somme and at the Battle of Passchendaele at Ypres in 1917. For his service as a corps commander, he was decorated with the Pour le Mérite on 11 August 1916.

In December 1917, Kirchbach moved to Eastern Front, where he became commander of Armee-Abteilung D, replacing his cousin General der Infanterie Günther Graf von Kirchbach. In January 1918 he was promoted to the rank of Generaloberst. Armee-Abteilung D was dissolved in October 1918, at which point he retired again.

== Later life ==
With the dissolution of Armee-Abteilung D in early October 1918, he retired after a total of 52 years of service. He lived in Dresden until his death on 23 July 1928. He is buried at the Nordfriedhof Cemetery.

== Awards ==
- Grand Cross of the Civil Order of Saxony
- Grand Cross of the Albert Order mit golden Star and Swords
- Saxon Service award Cross
- Grand Cross of the Bavarian Military Merit Order
- Honorary Grand Commander of the Oldenburg House and Merit Order of Peter Frederick Louis
- Grand Cross of the Order of the Red Eagle
- Order of the Crown (Prussia) 2nd Class with Star
- Iron Cross (1870) 2nd Class
- Cross of Honour (Reuß Younger Line) 1st Class
- Knight's Cross 1st Class of the Order of the White Falcon
- Grand Cross of the Ducal Saxe-Ernestine House Order
- Grand Cross of the Order of Frederick
- Spanish Grand Cross of the Military Order of Merit
- Grand Officer of the Order of Saints Maurice and Lazarus
- Order of the Iron Crown 1st Class
- Iron Cross (1914) 1st Class
- Military Order of St. Henry
  - Knight's Cross on 9 September 1914
  - Commander 2nd Class on 9 October 1915
  - Commander 1st Class on 28 August 1916
- Pour le Mérite on 11 August 1916

== Family ==
In Dresden on 29 September 1873, Kirchbach married Margaretha von Pawel-Rammingen (born 17 October 1852 in Braunschweig, died 13 September 1931 in Dresden), the daughter of the Duke of Brunswick's Chamberlain and Rittmeister, Albert von Pawel-Rammingen and his wife Elisabeth Martini. They had a son, Hans-Karl von Kirchbach (1876–1946), who died in late 1946 in Dresden in the Russian Central Prison, and a daughter, Elizabeth von Kirchbach (1874–1946).

== Glossary ==
- Armee-Abteilung or Army Detachment in the sense of "something detached from an Army". It is not under the command of an Army so is in itself a small Army.
- Armee-Gruppe or Army Group in the sense of a group within an Army and under its command, generally formed as a temporary measure for a specific task.
- Heeresgruppe or Army Group in the sense of a number of armies under a single commander.

== Bibliography ==
- von Baensch-Stiftung, Wilhelm; von Baensch-Stiftung, Bertha (1937). Der Königlich Sächsische Militär-St. Heinrichs-Orden 1736–1918, Ein Ehrenblatt der Sächsischen Armee. Dresden.
- Cron, Hermann (2002). Imperial German Army 1914–18: Organisation, Structure, Orders-of-Battle [first published: 1937]. Helion & Co. ISBN 1-874622-70-1.

Military offices
Preceded by General der Infanterie Alexander Graf Vitzthum von Eckstädt	Commander, XIX (2nd Royal Saxon) Corps; 27 November 1907 – 27 November 1913	Succeeded by General der Kavallerie Maximilian von Laffert
Preceded by New Formation	Commander, XII (Royal Saxon) Reserve Corps; 2 August 1914 – 15 December 1917	Succeeded by General der Infanterie Horst Edler von der Planitz
Preceded by General der Infanterie Günther Graf von Kirchbach	Commander, Armee-Abteilung D 14 December 1917 – 2 October 1918	Succeeded by Dissolved
