= 3rd Reserve Division (German Empire) =

3rd Reserve Division (3. Reserve-Division)
- Active: 1914–1919
- Country: Germany
- Branch: Army
- Type: Infantry
- Size: Approx. 15,000 World War I: Gumbinnen, Tannenberg, 1st Masurian Lakes, 2nd Masurian Lakes, 3rd Ypres, German spring offensive, Hundred Days Offensive

The 3rd Reserve Division (3. Reserve-Division) was a reserve infantry division of the Imperial German Army in World War I. It was formed on mobilization in August 1914 from reserve infantry units primarily from Pomerania. The division served from the beginning of the war until early 1917 on the Eastern Front, after which it was transferred to the Western Front. Allied intelligence rated it a third-class division.

== August 1914 organization ==
The 3rd Reserve Division's initial wartime organization was as follows:

- 5.Reserve-Infanterie-Brigade:
  - Pommersches Reserve-Infanterie-Regiment Nr. 2
  - Pommersches Reserve-Infanterie-Regiment Nr. 9
- 6.Reserve-Infanterie-Brigade:
  - Pommersches Reserve-Infanterie-Regiment Nr. 34
  - Pommersches Reserve-Infanterie-Regiment Nr. 49
- Reserve-Dragoner-Regiment Nr. 5
- Reserve-Feldartillerie-Regiment Nr. 3
- 2.Reserve-Kompanie/Pommersches Pionier-Bataillon Nr. 2

== Late World War I organization ==
Divisions underwent many changes during the war, with regiments moving from division to division, and some being destroyed and rebuilt. During the war, most divisions became triangular - one infantry brigade with three infantry regiments rather than two infantry brigades of two regiments (a "square division"). The 3rd Reserve Division triangularized in November 1915. An artillery commander replaced the artillery brigade headquarters, the cavalry was further reduced, the engineer contingent was increased, and a divisional signals command was created. The 3rd Reserve Division's order of battle on March 1, 1918, was as follows:

- 5.Reserve-Infanterie-Brigade:
  - Füsilier-Regiment Königin Viktoria von Schweden (1. Pommersches) Nr. 34
  - Pommersches Reserve-Infanterie-Regiment Nr. 49
  - Pommersches Reserve-Infanterie-Regiment Nr. 2
- 1.Eskadron/3. Badisches Dragoner-Regiment Prinz Karl Nr. 22
- Artillerie-Kommandeur 73:
  - Reserve-Feldartillerie-Regiment Nr. 3
  - IV.Bataillon/Reserve-Fußartillerie-Regiment Nr. 14 (from 23.06.1918)
- Stab Pionier-Bataillon Nr. 303:
  - 2. Reserve-Kompanie/Pommersches Pionier-Bataillon Nr. 2
  - 2. Reserve-Kompanie/Pionier-Bataillon Nr. 34
  - Minenwerfer-Kompanie Nr. 203
- Divisions-Nachrichten-Kommandeur 403
