= XXIII Reserve Corps =

XXIII Reserve Corps XXIII. Reserve-Korps
- Flag of the Staff of a Generalkommando (1871–1918)
- Active: October 1914 - 12 August 1918
- Country: German Empire
- Type: Corps
- Size: Approximately 32,000 (on formation)
- Engagements: World War I Western Front First Battle of Ypres

The XXIII Reserve Corps (German: XXIII. Reserve-Korps / XXIII RK) was a corps level command of the German Army in World War I.

== Formation ==
XXIII Reserve Corps was formed in October 1914. It was part of the first wave of new Corps formed at the outset of World War I consisting of XXII - XXVII Reserve Corps of 43rd - 54th Reserve Divisions (plus 6th Bavarian Reserve Division). The personnel was predominantly made up of kriegsfreiwillige (wartime volunteers) who did not wait to be called up. It was dissolved on 12 August 1918.

=== Structure on formation ===
On formation in October 1914, XXIII Reserve Corps consisted of two divisions. but was weaker than an Active Corps

- Reserve Infantry Regiments consisted of three battalions but only had a machine gun platoon (of 2 machine guns) rather than a machine gun company (of 6 machine guns)
- Reserve Jäger Battalions did not have a machine gun company on formation, though some were provided with a machine gun platoon
- Reserve Cavalry Detachments were much smaller than the Reserve Cavalry Regiments formed on mobilisation
- Reserve Field Artillery Regiments consisted of three abteilungen (2 gun and 1 howitzer) of three batteries each, but each battery had just 4 guns (rather than 6 of the Active and the Reserve Regiments formed on mobilisation)

In summary, XXIII Reserve Corps mobilised with 26 infantry battalions, 8 machine gun platoons (16 machine guns), 2 cavalry detachments, 18 field artillery batteries (72 guns) and 2 pioneer companies.

Corps	Division	Brigade	Units
XXIII Reserve Corps	45th Reserve Division	89th Reserve Infantry Brigade	209th Reserve Infantry Regiment
XXIII Reserve Corps	45th Reserve Division	89th Reserve Infantry Brigade	210th Reserve Infantry Regiment
XXIII Reserve Corps	45th Reserve Division	90th Reserve Infantry Brigade	211th Reserve Infantry Regiment
XXIII Reserve Corps	45th Reserve Division	90th Reserve Infantry Brigade	212th Reserve Infantry Regiment
XXIII Reserve Corps	45th Reserve Division		17th Reserve Jäger Battalion
XXIII Reserve Corps	45th Reserve Division		45th Reserve Field Artillery Regiment
XXIII Reserve Corps	45th Reserve Division		45th Reserve Cavalry Detachment
XXIII Reserve Corps	45th Reserve Division		45th Reserve Pioneer Company
XXIII Reserve Corps	46th Reserve Division	91st Reserve Infantry Brigade	213th Reserve Infantry Regiment
XXIII Reserve Corps	46th Reserve Division	91st Reserve Infantry Brigade	214th Reserve Infantry Regiment
XXIII Reserve Corps	46th Reserve Division	92nd Reserve Infantry Brigade	215th Reserve Infantry Regiment
XXIII Reserve Corps	46th Reserve Division	92nd Reserve Infantry Brigade	216th Reserve Infantry Regiment
XXIII Reserve Corps	46th Reserve Division		18th Reserve Jäger Battalion
XXIII Reserve Corps	46th Reserve Division		46th Reserve Field Artillery Regiment
XXIII Reserve Corps	46th Reserve Division		46th Reserve Cavalry Detachment
XXIII Reserve Corps	46th Reserve Division		46th Reserve Pioneer Company

== Commanders ==
XXIII Reserve Corps had the following commanders during its existence:

From	Rank	Name
25 August 1914	General der Kavallerie	Georg von Kleist
19 December 1914	General der Infanterie	Hugo von Kathen
31 July 1918	Generalleutnant	Arthur von Gabain

== Bibliography ==
- Cron, Hermann (2002). Imperial German Army 1914-18: Organisation, Structure, Orders-of-Battle [first published: 1937]. Helion & Co. ISBN 1-874622-70-1.
- Ellis, John; Cox, Michael (1993). The World War I Databook. Aurum Press Ltd. ISBN 1-85410-766-6.
- Busche, Hartwig (1998). Formationsgeschichte der Deutschen Infanterie im Ersten Weltkrieg (1914 bis 1918) (in German). Institut für Preußische Historiographie.
- Histories of Two Hundred and Fifty-One Divisions of the German Army which Participated in the War (1914-1918), compiled from records of Intelligence section of the General Staff, American Expeditionary Forces, at General Headquarters, Chaumont, France 1919. The London Stamp Exchange Ltd (1989). 1989 [1920]. ISBN 0-948130-87-3.
- The German Forces in the Field; 7th Revision, 11th November 1918; Compiled by the General Staff, War Office. Imperial War Museum, London and the Battery Press. 1995 [1918]. ISBN 978-1-870423-95-3.
