= Friedrich von Scholtz =

Prussian general (1851–1927)

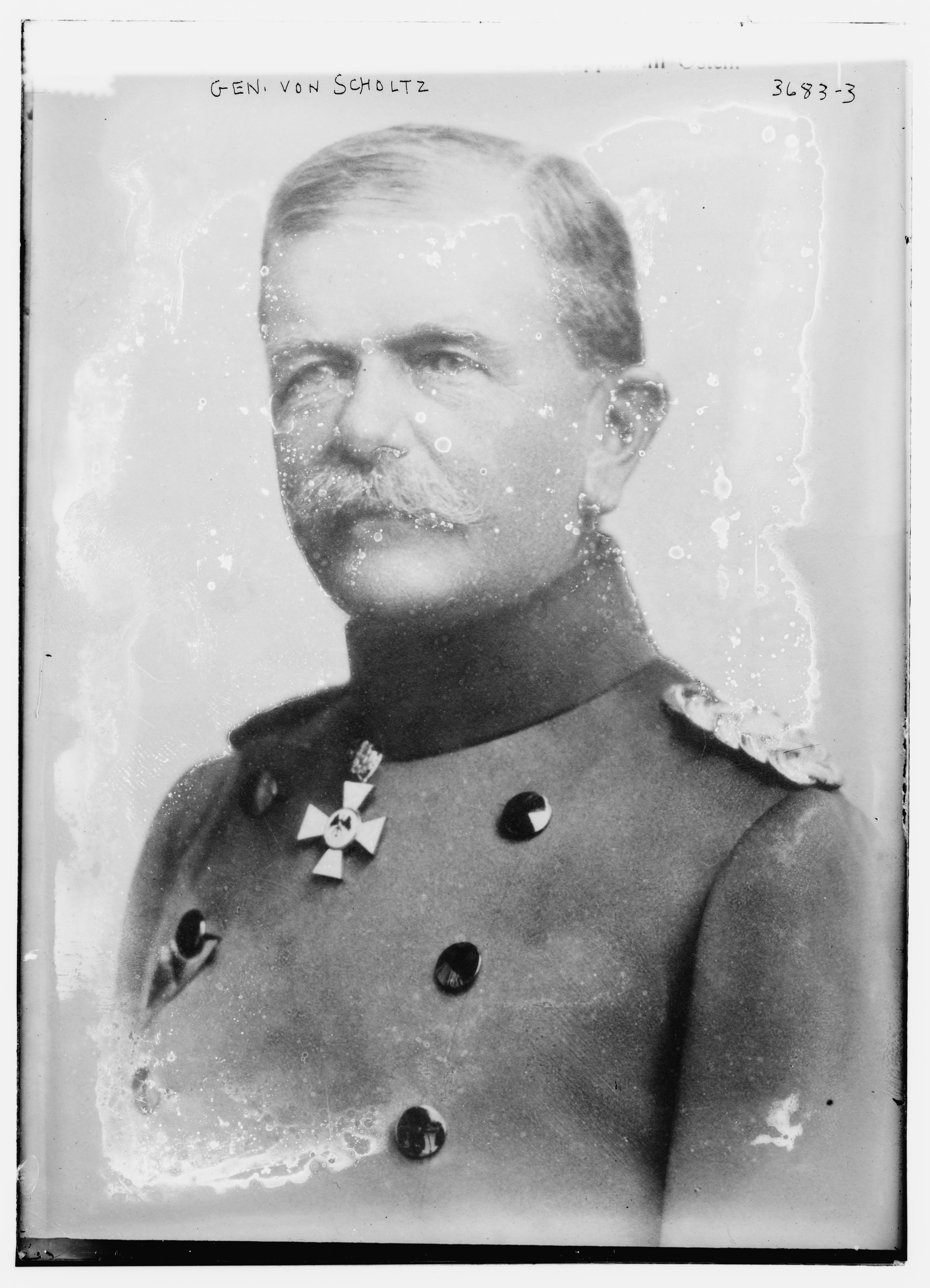
- Born: 24 March 1851; Flensburg, Duchy of Schleswig
- Died: 30 April 1927 (aged 76); Ballenstedt, Germany
- Military career
- Allegiance: Prussia; German Empire
- Branch: Prussian Army; Imperial German Army
- Service years: 1870–1919
- Rank: General of the Artillery
- Commands: XX Corps; 8th Army; Armee-Abteilung Scholtz; Heeresgruppe Scholtz
- Conflicts: Franco-Prussian War; World War I
- Awards: Pour le Mérite

Boje Friedrich Nikolaus von Scholtz (born 24 March 1851 in Flensburg – died 30 April 1927 in Ballenstedt) was a German general, who served as commander of 20th Corps and the 8th Army of the German Empire on the Eastern Front in the First World War and later as commander of Army Group Scholtz on the Macedonian front.

== Early life ==
Growing up in Ballenstedt, Scholtz's military career began in 1870 in Rendsburg as a Gunner in the artillery and senior officer cadet. Later that year he volunteered for the Franco-Prussian War. After the war, he studied at the Military Academy in Potsdam and on 9 March 1872 he qualified as an artillery officer with the rank of lieutenant. Between 1874 and 1876, he studied at the artillery school in Berlin and in 1901 was promoted to colonel. In 1908, he was appointed to command the 21st Division of the Imperial Army and on 1 October 1912 was promoted to General of the Artillery and given command of XX Army Corps.

== First World War ==
With the outbreak of the First World War, Scholtz was transferred together with his army corps to the Eastern Front where he took part in the Battle of Tannenberg and the Battle of Lodz.

He was appointed commander of the 8th Army, which figured in the Great Russian Retreat of 1915.

On April 22, 1917, Scholtz was transferred to the Balkans, where he replaced General Otto von Below as commander of the army group consisting of the 11th German Army and 1st Bulgarian Army. His force was almost entirely made up of Bulgarian units, as most of the German forces had been pulled out of the Balkans. The 11th German Army was no exception, and by 1918 it had six Bulgarian infantry divisions and one infantry division with German staff but made up of Bulgarian units. Scholtz managed to coordinate the activities on the Macedonian front and gained a good reputation with Germany's Bulgarian allies.

In September 1918, Allied forces launched an offensive under the command of French General Louis Franchet d'Espèrey, an offensive along the valley of the river Vardar against Army Group "Scholtz". The Allies managed to break through the lines of the 11th Army and to force Scholtz to order a retreat in the sector of Dobro Pole, but the Bulgarian First Army had achieved a victory at the Battle of Doiran. So now the Allied forces were advancing up the Vardar, but their flanks were exposed to a possible blow from the right wing of the 11th Army, which was still fighting in good order, and from the 1st Bulgarian Army. General Scholtz however thought that such an attack was not well enough prepared and preferred to order a general retreat of his army group, hoping that the situation would stabilize.

His Army Group Headquarters was moved from Skopje to Jagodina, but the situation continued to deteriorate, and some Bulgarian soldiers even mutinied and headed towards Sofia. This forced the capitulation of Bulgaria on 29 September 1918. The news came as a shock to the Bulgarian officers who were serving in units on the right wing of the 11th Army, but eventually they obeyed the order to lay down their weapons. As a last gesture, some of them delayed the Allies long enough for the German soldiers and officers who were fighting with them to be able to retreat and escape being captured. The army group was now dissolved, and General Scholtz was sent to Romania to organize the defense there.

With the end of the war, Scholtz was discharged from military service on January 24, 1919. He retired to civilian life and died eight years later at the age of 76 years.

== Bibliography ==
- Ferdinand von Notz: General v. Scholtz- Ein deutsches Soldatenleben in großer Zeit
- Genealogisches Handbuch des Adels, Adelslexikon Band XIII, Band 128 der Gesamtreihe, C. A. Starke Verlag, Limburg (Lahn) 2002, ISSN 0435-2408.
- Hall, Richard (2010). Balkan Breakthrough: The Battle of Dobro Pole 1918. Indiana University Press. ISBN 978-0-253-35452-5.

Military offices
Preceded by New Formation	Commander, XX Corps; 1 October 1912 – 28 October 1915	Succeeded by Upgraded to Armee-Abteilung D
Preceded by General der Infanterie Otto von Below	Commander, 8th Army; Simultaneous with command of XX Corps; 26 May – 29 September 1915	Succeeded by Dissolved
Preceded by Upgraded from XX Corps	Commander, Armee-Abteilung D 28 October 1915 – 2 January 1917	Succeeded by Generalleutnant Oskar von Hutier
Preceded by General der Infanterie Bruno von Mudra	Commander, 8th Army; 2 January – 22 April 1917	Succeeded by General der Infanterie Oskar von Hutier
Preceded by General der Infanterie Otto von Below	Commander, Army Group Scholtz; 23 April 1917 – 11 November 1918	Succeeded by Dissolved
