= 24th Reserve Division =

24th Reserve Division (24. Reserve-Division)
- Active: 1914-1919
- Country: Saxony/Germany
- Branch: Army
- Type: Infantry
- Size: Approx. 15,000
- Engagements: World War I: Great Retreat, First Battle of the Marne, Second Battle of Champagne, Battle of the Somme, Kerensky Offensive, Passchendaele, German spring offensive, Hundred Days Offensive

The Royal Saxon 24th Reserve Division (Kgl. Sächsische 24. Reserve-Division) was a unit of the Imperial German Army in World War I. The division was formed on mobilization of the German Army in August 1914 as part of the XII (Royal Saxon) Reserve Corps. The division was disbanded in 1919 during the demobilization of the German Army after World War I. The division was raised in the Kingdom of Saxony.

== Combat chronicle ==
The 24th Reserve Division fought on the Western Front, participating in the opening German offensive which led to the Allied Great Retreat and ended with the First Battle of the Marne. Thereafter, the division remained in the line in the Champagne region through the end of 1914 and until July 1916, and fought in the Second Battle of Champagne in the autumn of 1915. In late July 1916, the division entered the Battle of the Somme, fighting there with a few respites until November 1916 and then returning to positional warfare in the trenchlines. It was sent to the Eastern Front at the end of April 1917, and fought against the Kerensky Offensive, the last major Russian offensive of the war. The division returned to the Western Front in late October/early November and saw action in the last phases of the Battle of Passchendaele. The division then participated in the 1918 German spring offensive and the subsequent Allied offensives and counteroffensives, including the Hundred Days Offensive. Allied intelligence rated the division as third class.

== Order of battle on mobilization ==
The order of battle of the 24th Reserve Division on mobilization was as follows:

- 47. Reserve-Infanterie-Brigade
  - Kgl. Sächs. Reserve-Infanterie-Regiment Nr. 104
  - Kgl. Sächs. Reserve-Infanterie-Regiment Nr. 106
  - Kgl. Sächs. Reserve-Jäger-Bataillon Nr. 13
- 48. Reserve-Infanterie-Brigade
  - Kgl. Sächs. Reserve-Infanterie-Regiment Nr. 107
  - Kgl. Sächs. Reserve-Infanterie-Regiment Nr. 133
- Kgl. Sächs. Reserve-Ulanen-Regiment
- Kgl. Sächs. Reserve-Feldartillerie-Regiment Nr. 24
- 1.Kompanie/Kgl. Sächs. Reserve-Pionier-Bataillon Nr. 12
- 2.Kompanie/Kgl. Sächs. Reserve-Pionier-Bataillon Nr. 12

== Order of battle on March 21, 1918 ==
The 24th Reserve Division was triangularized in March 1915. Over the course of the war, other changes took place, including the formation of artillery and signals commands and a pioneer battalion. The order of battle on March 21, 1918, was as follows:

- 48. Reserve-Infanterie-Brigade
  - Kgl. Sächs. Reserve-Infanterie-Regiment Nr. 104
  - Kgl. Sächs. Reserve-Infanterie-Regiment Nr. 107
  - Kgl. Sächs. Reserve-Infanterie-Regiment Nr. 133
  - Maschinengewehr-Scharfschützen-Abteilung Nr. 50
- 3.Eskadron/Kgl. Sächs. Reserve-Husaren-Regiment
- Kgl. Sächs. Artillerie-Kommandeur 120
  - Kgl. Sächs. Reserve-Feldartillerie-Regiment Nr. 68
  - I.Bataillon/Kgl. Bayer. 1. Fußartillerie-Regiment
- Kgl. Sächs. Stab Pionier-Bataillon Nr. 324
  - 1.Kompanie/Kgl. Sächs. Reserve-Pionier-Bataillon Nr. 12
  - 6.Kompanie/Kgl. Sächs. Reserve-Pionier-Bataillon Nr. 12
  - Kgl. Sächs. Minenwerfer-Kompanie Nr. 224
- Kgl. Sächs. Divisions-Nachrichten-Kommandeur 424
