= First Battle of the Masurian Lakes =

World War I battle in 1914

Coordinates: 54.0000°N 22.0000°E

- Part of the Eastern Front of World War I
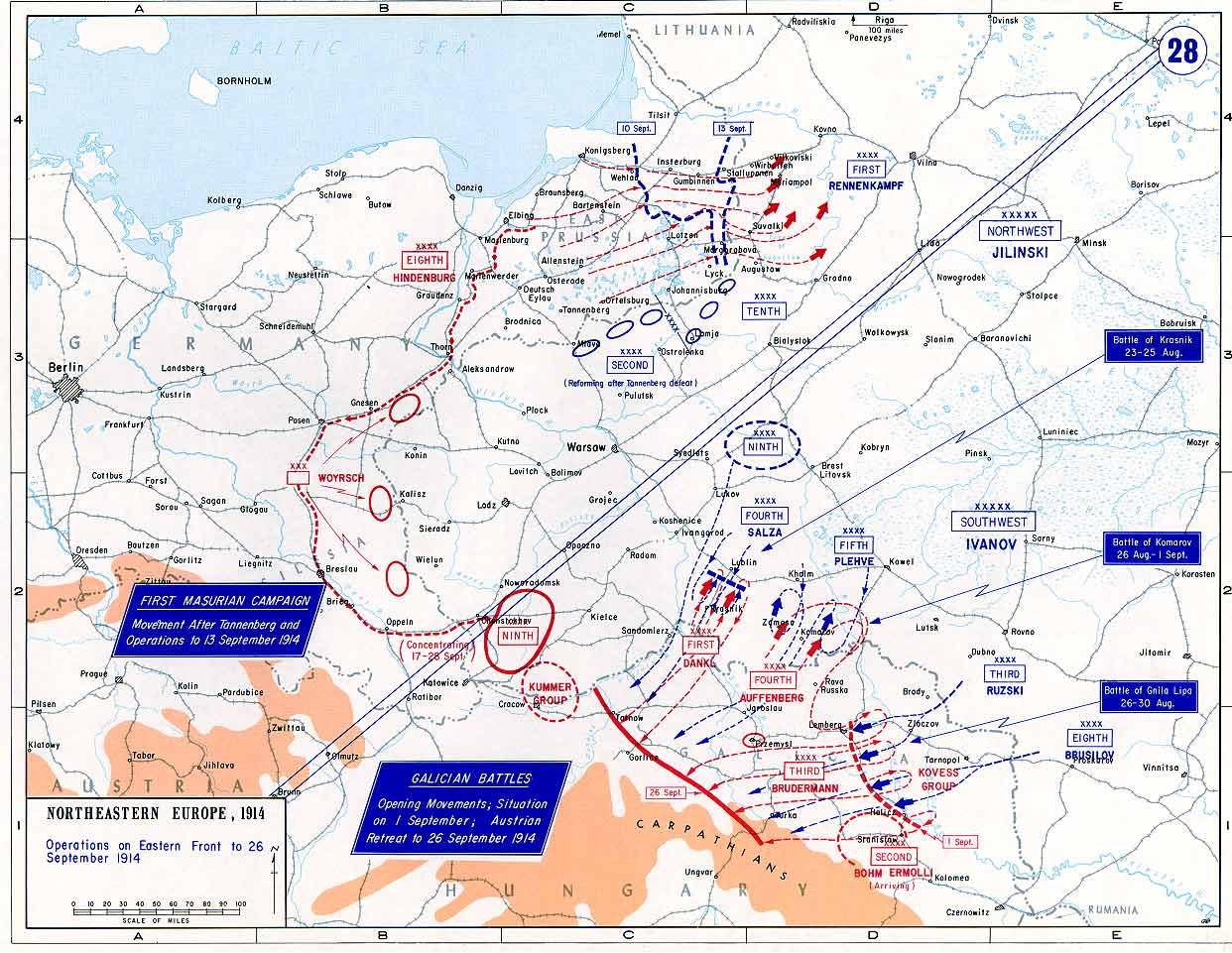
- Eastern Front to 26 September 1914
Date	2–16 September 1914
Location	East Prussia, Germany (present-day Russia and Poland)
Result	German victory
Territorial changes	Russian ejection from East Prussia

Belligerents
Germany	Russian Empire

Commanders and leaders
Paul von Hindenburg; Erich Ludendorff; August von Mackensen	Paul von Rennenkampf

Units involved
8th Army	1st Army; 10th Army

Strength
Total 244,391 men 7 military corps 1,146 guns 400 machine guns	Total 553,937 men 1,673 guns 960 machine guns: 1st army: 306,470 men, 924 guns 395 machine guns 10th army: 247,467 men 749 guns 565 machine guns

Casualties and losses
German official medical reports (1 - 30.09.1914): 1,555 KIA, 10,412 WIA, 1,552 MIA, Total 13,519; Lost: 17 guns 17 machine guns 10,000 killed, wounded and missing Other Estimate: 40,000 killed and wounded	100,000–125,000 killed, wounded and captured, Lost: 162 guns 174 machine guns 70,000 killed and wounded, 30,000–45,000 prisoners Russian Estimate: about 60,000 died, wounded and prisoners Staff of the Russian NW front: 100,000 men, including 50,000 prisoners

The First Battle of the Masurian Lakes was a German offensive in the Eastern Front 2–16 September 1914, during the Russian invasion of East Prussia. It took place only days after the Battle of Tannenberg where the German 8th Army encircled and destroyed the Russian 2nd Army. Using the rapid movements aided by the East Prussian railway network, the 8th Army reformed in front of the spread-out Russian 1st Army and pushed it back across its entire front, eventually ejecting it from Germany. Further progress was hampered by the arrival of the Russian 10th Army on the Germans' right flank.

By the conclusion of the battle, the Imperial German Army had destroyed the 2nd Army and shattered the First in a series of actions over only a few weeks. However, Russia had the largest army in the world, so the Russian army very quickly restored its losses in manpower, and after a couple of weeks the Russians launched a new offensive in East Prussia.

== Background ==
The Russian offensive in East Prussia had started well enough, with General Paul von Rennenkampf's 1st Army (Army of the Neman) forcing the 8th Army westward from the border towards Königsberg. Meanwhile, the Russian 2nd Army invaded from the south, hoping to cut the Germans off in the area around the city. The lack of railways and logistical problems meant they made slow progress even though they faced only a single German army corps.

During their advance Yakov Zhilinsky, Chief of Staff of the Imperial Russian Army, made a strategic mistake by separating two large Russian armies and urging them to move rapidly over a marginally trafficable terrain in response to the requests of the French for an early offensive. As a result, the armies approached in a poorly coordinated manner, being isolated from each other by terrain obstacles, and before the logistical base could be established, the troops were worn down by a rapid march and had to face fresh German troops.

The Germans developed a plan to rapidly move their forces to surround the 2nd Army as it moved northward over some particularly hilly terrain. The danger was that the 1st Army would turn to their aid, thereby flanking the German forces. However, the Russians broadcast their daily marching orders "in the clear" on the radio, and the Germans learned that the 1st Army was continuing to move away from the Second. Using railways in the area, the German forces maneuvered and eventually surrounded and destroyed the 2nd Army at the Battle of Tannenberg between 26 and 30 August 1914.

According to Prit Buttar, "as the magnitude of the disaster that had befallen Samsonov's army became clear, Rennenkampf ordered his men to pull back from their most advanced positions. 1st Army took up a line running from the Deime valley in the north, through Wehlau and Nordenberg, to the northern shore of the Mauer-See, immediately to the west of Angerburg." His reserve divisions formed the new 26th Army Corps on his northern flank. Between Wehlau and Nordenburg were his 3rd and 4th Army Corps. The 2nd Army Corps was placed opposite the German garrison in Lötzen. In addition, Rennenkampf received 5 newly formed reserve divisions (54th, 57th, 68th, 72nd, 76th). The total strength of the 1st Army was more than 300,000 men, including 50,000 in reserve (garrisons of fortresses in the rear of the 1st Army). The 10th Army filled the gap with what was left of the 2nd Army. The 10th Army was newly formed, and consisted of the 22nd Army Corps from Finland, the 3rd Siberian Army Corps, the 1st Turkestan Army Corps, and the 2nd Caucasian Army Corps, with the 22nd Army Corps opposite Lyck, and the 3rd Siberian Army Corps to their south. Two corps were kept in reserve. The total strength of the 10th Army was 250,000 men. In the reserve of the 10th Army there were garrisons of fortresses with more than 37,000 men.

On 31 August, Hindenburg received the following orders, "XI Corps, Guards Reserve Corps, and 8th Cavalry Division are placed at your disposal. Their transport has begun. The first task of 8th Army is to clear East Prussia of Rennenkampf's army. When the situation in East Prussia has been restored you are to contemplate employing 8th Army in the direction of Warsaw." Hindenburg and Ludendorff placed their Guards Reserve Corps, I Reserve Corps, XI Corps and the XX Corps on the Russian northern flank. Their XVII Corps was deployed at Lötzen, and their I Corps around Lyck. The total strength of the 8th Army was 244,391 men, including troops against the Russian 2nd Army.

== Battle ==
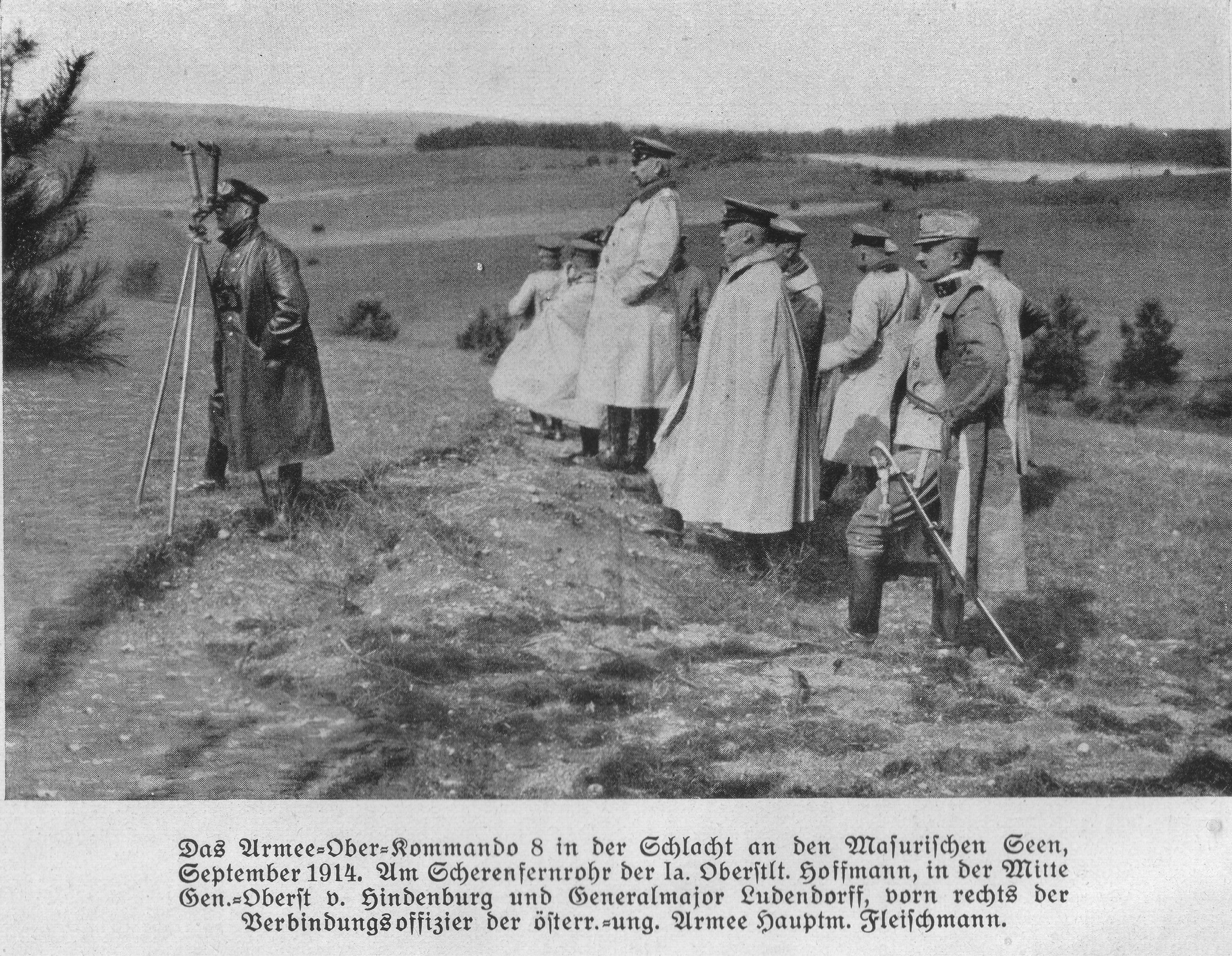
General staff of the German 8th Army during the battle

During September 2–3, the Russian cavalry occupied Kelladen and Schelecken and faced the German infantry across the Deime River. The Russian 3rd Army Corps repulsed all German attacks at Levenhagen and was preparing for pursuit by the forces of the 1st Guards Cavalry Division. The Russian 4th Army Corps at Gross-Wolfsdorf repulsed the attacks of the German 1st Reserve Division and occupied Friedland with the forces of the 40th Infantry Division.

But on the left flank of the Russian 1st Army, the situation worsened. On the site of the 2nd Army Corps, the German XX Corps occupied Rastenburg and Barten; the Russian 2nd Guards Cavalry Division retreated from Drengfurth. The 1st Cavalry Division of Vasily Gurko, advancing on Allenstein, was met by fire from the German 147th Infantry Regiment and two squadrons of the 11th Dragoon Regiment. Having lost five officers and 15 soldiers, Gurko was able to knock the Germans out of position, but could not withstand the counterattack of the cavalry brigade and retreated in battle to Krolikheim.

By September 7–8, the command of the German 8th Army unhinderedly concentrated shock groups in front of the positions of the 1st Army and the intensification of operations east of Königsberg disoriented Russian intelligence. The Guards Reserve Corps (3rd Guards, 1st Guards Reserve Divisions; commander General of Artillery Max von Gallwitz) took over the site near Allenburg, and the XI Corps (22nd, 38th Infantry Divisions; commander General of infantry Otto von Plüskow) took over the site near Nordenburg.

The concentration and offensive of the Russian 22nd Army Corps—the vanguard of the Russian 10th Army—at first did not meet with Germans opposition. But on September 7, the German offensive began against the Russian 10th Army. The German 3rd Reserve Division, after a 2-hour artillery preparation, captured the city of Bialla, capturing 400 prisoners and 8 guns from the detachment of Lieutenant General Stanislav Stelnitsky (1st, 2nd, 4th and 12th Finnish Rifle Regiments). The next day, the Curt von Morgen group broke through the Russian defenses and entered the operational space. To counter the enemy offensive, the 2nd and 4th Finnish Rifle Brigades were sent to Lyck, the 10th Finnish Rifle Regiment to Arys, and the 27th Siberian Rifle Regiment to Grajewo. The 8th Siberian Rifle Division of the arriving 3rd Siberian Army Corps was supposed to go to the rear of the Germans.

The German I Corps advanced on Widminnen, where the 1st Infantry Division took up to 1,000 prisoners; another 1,000 defenders (parts of the 43rd Infantry Division and the 3rd Finnish Rifle Brigade) lost killed and wounded. On the front to the north, the Germans continued to approach the Russian positions on the Deime and Alla rivers.

The commander of the Russian 10th Army, infantry general Vasily Flug, ordered the 22nd and 3rd Siberian Army Corps (97,084 men, 192 machine guns, 240 guns) to go on the offensive on Johannisburg, but on the night of September 8, the German 3rd Reserve Division attacked the junction of the 1st and 10th Armies near the city Lyck. The 22nd Army Corps left the city by the morning of September 9, having lost 96 killed, 493 wounded and 350 missing. The 36th Reserve Division released Lötzen, capturing 1,000 prisoners and 16 guns. The 43rd Infantry Division and the Finnish 3rd Rifle Brigade retreated under the onslaught of the Germans from Aris

The commander of the Russian 22nd Army Corps, A. von Brinken, considered it necessary to withdraw troops to the defensive line. But the commander of the 10th Army forbade the retreat and ordered at all costs to strike and assist the 1st Army. Von Brinken objected: the continuation of the battle would lead to a complete loss of combat capability, and no assistance would be provided. He proposed to withdraw the vanguards of the army to Augustow, concentrate there, arrange the rear and organize supplies, and then go on the offensive with a single fist. After negotiations with the headquarters of the armies of the North-Western Front, Flug allowed to withdraw to Augustow.

On September 9, the Guards Reserve Corps of Artillery General M. von Gallwitz went on the offensive against the center of the Russian 1st Army near Allenburg. His 3rd and 1st reserve guards divisions started a battle at the crossings across the Alle River and here they encountered stubborn resistance from the Russian 3rd and 20th Army Corps, reinforced by the 54th and 72nd Infantry Divisions. With great difficulty, with the support of the Landwehr from the fortress of Posen (division of Lieutenant General Anatol Graf von Bredow), they managed to gain a foothold at Redden and Schillen. The Russian artillery inflicted especially great damage on the attackers; von Gallwitz ordered at night the artillery brigades to get as close as possible to the Russian positions in order to open fire at close range in the morning and suppress the Russian batteries. From Posen, heavy artillery arrived in the corps under the command of Lieutenant General O. Gereke.

The situation on the left flank of the 1st Army was becoming threatening. The distracting group of Morgen wedged into the location of the Russian troops and created a threat of encirclement in front of the rivers Instruch and Angerapp.

The Russians took urgent measures to strengthen the flank and to gradually withdraw troops from under the blow of the Germans—to the Angerapp River. By the evening of September 9, a grouping of troops was assembled to launch a counterattack on the flank of the corps of Hermann von François and Morgen. For this, 9 Russian divisions were concentrated in the Gołdap area (the 2nd and 20th Army Corps, the Gurko cavalry detachment and the 54th, 57th and 76th Infantry Divisions). Rennenkampf ordered to shoot anyone who left the trenches without an order. He also turned to the headquarters of the armies of the North-Western Front with a request to support his actions with the offensive of the 10th Army, but the quartermaster general of the headquarters, Major General V. Leontiev, stated that "the corps have not yet been arranged."

At the same time, during the day, the Guards Reserve Corps was able to build 5 bridges on the Alle River on both sides of Allenburg; to parry a possible Russian counterattack (and German reconnaissance established the arrival of two divisions), Bredow's landwehr division was advanced to the threatened direction, and to the south of Tapiau, a detachment of K. Wolgemut from the garrison of Koenigsberg (5 battalions and 2 squadrons with strong artillery).

Rennenkampf did not lose hope of repelling the blow of the German army. He instructs the Huseyn Khan Nakhchivanski to move to Goldap and delay the advance of the Germans. The Rauch division is directed to Benkheim and Marggrаbоwo, the detachment of Lieutenant General Anatoly Rosenshield (54th and 28th Infantry Divisions) to Trempen and Kiselen, the 29th Infantry Division to Darkehmen. The defense of the Deime River was entrusted to the newly formed 26th Army Corps of Infantry General Aleksandr Gerngross (53rd and 56th Infantry Divisions, 73rd Artillery Brigade).

Throughout the day on September 9, units of the Russian 3rd Army Corps held back the Germans at Allenburg, and the 4th Army Corps at Bavien. But in the 2nd Army Corps, the Germans occupied Widminnen, went to Lake Gablick, where they were stopped by the 1st Cavalry Division entering the battle. In the battles, the Russian 302nd Surazh Infantry Regiment was defeated, the commander of the 1st Brigade of the 26th Infantry Division, Major General K. Druzhinin, was killed. At Kutten, the Russian 72nd Infantry Division was brought into battle.

Thus, both sides were concentrating forces on the southern flank, striving to envelop the enemy's battle formation. At the same time, P. Rennenkampf also counted on a powerful blow with three corps in the direction of Melauken, Wirbeln, Norkitten, Nordenburg—in the center and northern flank of the Germans.

On September 7, the Russian 2nd Army launched a diversionary attack on Myszyniec and captured the city by the night of September 10. The cavalry drove out the German vanguards from Friedrichshof. These attacks were carried out by a few detachments, since the army had not yet recovered from the defeat at Tannenberg. The attack on Mława was not successful, but by the morning of September 13, Janów was taken. During this time, 17 prisoners were captured. Russian losses were 22 killed, 120 wounded and 19 missing. The main result of the actions of the 2nd Army during this period was that the German 8th Army was deprived of the opportunity to reinforce the troops against the 1st Army at the expense of its Southern Group and had to constantly worry about the right flank. Only on the orders of the Supreme Commander-in-Chief did the 2nd Army begin to retreat to its original positions, since the headquarters of the front armies feared a breakthrough here too.

On September 10, the shock group of the 1st Army launched an offensive from the Gołdap area, but was met by hurricane artillery and machine-gun fire, first at the attacking chains, and then at the Russian positions. Taking advantage of the confusion, the 1st German reserve corps captured Goldap on the move, taking 1,000 prisoners and 32 guns in the city, and then advanced to Insterburg. Having lost a springboard for regrouping, the Russian 2nd Army Corps retreated. His 43rd Infantry Division suffered heavy casualties; in the companies of the 26th Infantry Division, 5-10 men remained (it lost more than 4,000 men).

Rennenkampf was furious at the failure of the counterattack. He demanded from the commander of the 20th Army Corps, General of Infantry V. Smirnov, the most energetic actions to support the 2nd Army Corps. Using the success of the I Corps and I Reserve Corps, the divisions of the Guards Reserve Corps crossed the Alle and Omet rivers and began the pursuit to Velau

On September 10, the headquarters of the 22nd Army Corps moved to Augustow. Four brigades of the corps, united in the detachments of Stelnitsky and Lieutenant General Vladimir von Notbek, retreated to Kallinowen and Lake Skomenten. The German regiments of the I Corps at that time launched an offensive against the flank of the Russian 2nd Army Corps. The 44th Infantry Regiment of the 2nd Infantry Division occupied Gross Pillaken and Gross Jakunoven, capturing 657 Russian prisoners (including 7 officers) and 8 guns.

The German 3rd Reserve Division entered Lyck. The combined cavalry corps of Lieutenant General Hermann Bernhard Brecht (1st and 8th Cavalry Divisions) moved into the gap between the flanks of the Russian 1st and 10th Armies. By evening, the German cavalry reached Kovalen, intercepting the retreat routes of the 1st Army. The German I and XVII Corps were involved in the battle for Goldap, and the 3rd Reserve Division and the 1st Cavalry Brigade defended Lyck against the troops of the Russian 10th Army. The Russian 20th Army Corps, reinforced by the 54th, 57th and 72nd Infantry Divisions, suffered huge losses (over 16,000 men, not counting the completely destroyed 72nd Division), but did not allow the Germans to enter the Russian rear.

The divisions of the Russian 3rd and 4th Army Corps defended steadfastly at the turn of the Omet and Angerapp rivers. Their resistance did not allow the collapse of the right flank of the 1st Army and created an opportunity for the transfer of two divisions of the 20th Army Corps, and then the cavalry corps of Khan Nakhichevan to the breakthrough site of Brecht's German cavalry. Only on the night of September 12 did the Russian 40th Infantry Division retreat across the Angerapp River and destroy the bridges behind them. Her losses exceeded 1,600 men. Until the evening of September 11, the Guards and the 1st Reserve and the XI Corps and XX Corps of the Germans could not move forward against these forces.

Nevertheless, the results of the battle on September 10 were depressing for Rennenkampf. By midnight, the 2nd Army Corps retreated across the Gołdapa River, the counterattacks of the 20th Army Corps were repulsed. The Germans with the forces of the I Reserve Corps pursued the Friedrichswald, the Guards Reserve Corps occupied Neumühl, Hoendamerau, the Wolgemut detachment—Wehlau. Considering the growing threat of covering the left flank of the army, Rennenkampf ordered on the night of September 11 to begin a withdrawal.

The commander of the 10th Army, General of Artillery V. Flug, on the morning of September 11, attacked Lyck with the 3rd Siberian Army Corps (7th and 8th Siberian Rifle Divisions) and the 22nd Army Corps. The 3rd Siberian Army Corps persistently attacked Lyck until the morning of September 12, and although the city was never taken, the German command attracted the landwehr division of R. von der Goltz from the Narew direction to defend it. The 3rd Reserve Division was unable to reinforce the bypass group, which crashed south of Goldap into the flank of the 1st Army. But the detachments of Stelnitsky and Notbek, who received the task of hitting the rear of the Germans at Marggrabowa and Wielitsken, were just deploying. In total, the 10th Army lost 343 killed, 1,105 wounded and 451 missing in these battles and captured 4 wounded German soldiers.

On September 11, German corps began pursuing the retreating Russian corps of the 1st Army. The Guards Reserve Corps crossed the Pregolya river and reached Norkitten. The I Reserve Corps entrenched itself in Insterburg, the I Corps in Rominten Forest, the XVII and XX Army Corps reached Nemmersdorf. The 9th Landwehr Brigade successfully advanced to Tilsit, bypassing the right flank of the Russians.

The stubborn resistance of the troops of the 1st Army, led, however, to significant fatigue of the Russian troops, and to a temporary loss of control over them. There were also extremely heavy losses. In a few days, the 1st army lost (according to incomplete data) 3,603 killed, 13,202 wounded and 44,475 missing.

On September 11, the commander-in-chief of the armies of the North-Western Front, Y. Zhilinsky, ordered P. von Rennenkampf to withdraw troops to the Neman line. During the day of September 11, the 4th Army Corps repelled most of the German attacks and was pushed back only on the right flank. The 2nd and 20th Army Corps retreated with a battle for Gawaiten and Groß Sobrost. The 2nd Guards Cavalry Division (G. Rauch), after a stubborn battle at Kovalen, retreated to Tolmingkemen. The 1st and 2nd Guards Cavalry Divisions retreated to Gurken. On the extreme right flank of the 1st Army, Tilsit was surrounded.

The retreat of the 1st Army soon took on the character of flight. In previous battles, the Germans managed to create a threat of encirclement of the left flank with a blow from the Romincka Forest to the north—with cutting off the mass of P. von Rennenkampf's troops on the Angerapp River. This caused the haste of the withdrawal of three corps, the mixing of troops, and the loss of communications. On September 12–13, Rennenkampf, who retreated with the headquarters and command of the army in Kovno, lost command of the troops and restored communication only by the night of September 14.

The loss of communication was caused primarily by panic in the immediate rear. The army was served by large telegraph and telephone centers in Suwalki, Augustow and Sejny. At the first news of the retreat of the army on September 12, the civil administration abandoned their posts and fled, cutting telegraph and telephone lines. Therefore, the blame for the loss of command and control lies to a large extent on the civilian department.

On September 12, the Russian 20th Army Corps retreated to the Trakehnen-Tollmingkehinel line, continually coming under fire from German artillery. On September 14–16, the divisions of the corps retreated successively to Marijampolė, Lyudvinovo and Simnas. The troops suffered heavy losses during the withdrawal; as a result, the 54th Infantry Division was disbanded. By September 19, the 28th and 29th Infantry Divisions were entrenched in positions near Alytus.

On September 12, the divisions of the 26th Army Corps took up a position at Kussen, Kattenau, keeping in touch with the 3rd Army Corps and preparing to repulse the advancing Germans. The Russian 53rd and 56th Divisions and the 5th Rifle Brigade fought a stubborn battle until late in the evening, when the 3rd Army Corps had already retreated to Vilkaviškis. By nightfall, the corps broke away from the Germans and withdrew to Širvinta River and Vladislavov, on September 13, the 53rd and 56th divisions withdrew to Šakiai. The 53rd and 56th Divisions were withdrawn from the corps to the reserve of the 1st Army, and in return the 57th and 64th Infantry Divisions were subordinated.

The German 9th Landwehr Brigade of Lieutenant General Hermann Clausius advanced on Tilsit. On this site there was a detachment of Major General V. Malm (1st Brigade of the 68th Infantry Division and 1st Division of the 68th Artillery Brigade) and the 6th Taurogen Border Guard Brigade, reinforced by two hundred Cossacks and a militia squad. The flanks of the detachment were provided by the 1st Separate Cavalry Brigade and the 53rd Infantry Division at Labiau.

From the evening of September 11, the Germans pressed the border guards from Kovalen to the Alexandrovskoye. By the morning of September 12, the Germans made their way to the bridges on the Neman, and by noon completely surrounded the city. From 15 o'clock the bombardment began, the cavalry retreated to Kovno. In Tilsit, an uprising of the population began; retreating Russian troops were shot from the windows of houses. The 270th Gatchina Infantry Regiment was surrounded and, while trying to break through, lost its commander (Colonel A. Volkov was captured), almost all the officers and 3,000 soldiers. 8 machine guns, 16 guns were lost, and General Malm was also captured. The remnants of the detachments (8 officers and 869 soldiers) retreated to Shavli.

The 22nd Army Corps was ordered to go on the offensive to rescue the 1st Army, hitting the rear of the Germans. The attack was scheduled for noon, but the commander-in-chief of the armies of the North-Western Front, cavalry general Yakov Zhilinsky, categorically forbade the attack and ordered the corps to be withdrawn. After the Germans occupied Suwalki on September 14, the brigades of the corps were assigned to Lipsk, Sztabin. On September 16, the Germans knocked down the corps from the Augustow position and occupied Augustow. The corps managed to gain a foothold at the crossings near Lipsk and Sapotskin and received the task of defending the paths to Grodno.

The soldiers pursued by the Germans, deprived of leadership, lacking not only ammunition, but also provisions, began to surrender en masse. The panic began. The Germans captured 12,000 men and 80 guns. By September 14, East Prussia was cleared of Russian troops, they continued to retreat across the Neman River. On September 14–15, the German vanguard captured Mariampol, Suwalki, Vladislavov and Pilviškiai. An attempt to stop the Germans at Mariampol by the forces of the Russian 4th Army Corps failed: he retreated, losing 52 killed, 163 wounded, 83 missing. On September 15, the German 3rd Reserve Division captured the city of Augustow, left by the 22nd Army Corps of the 10th Army.

Nevertheless, Rennenkampf managed to restore control of the troops, withdrawing the army beyond the Neman from Olita to Kovno. He escaped encirclement, although the Russian troops were defeated. The pursuing German cavalry also suffered significant losses. So, in the battles of September 10–14, the Saxon cavalry regiments of the 8th Division lost 9 officers killed (including the commander of the Horse Guards Regiment, Major E. Grafen) and 29 soldiers, 8 officers and 53 soldiers wounded, 2 missing and 1 soldier capture.

== Casualties and losses ==
Casualties 1st Army at the First Battle of the Masurian Lakes were estimated by the staff of the Russian North-Western front at 100,000 men (of which up to 50% were prisoners), 122 machine guns and 150 guns.

For the entire East Prussian campaign, according to the lists of regiments and reports of the commanders of divisions and brigades 1st Army, 275 officers and 9,347 soldiers were killed, 557 officers and 25,616 soldiers were wounded, 449 officers and 65,608 soldiers were missing, in total - 1,826 officers and 115,374 soldiers (including without indication casualty categories - 545 officers and 14,219 soldiers of the 54th and 72nd Infantry Divisions).

Due to the defeat of a number of headquarters and the loss of documents, the casualties of almost the entire 54th Infantry Division remain unexplained (as of September 18, 1914, 284 officers, 11,810 soldiers, 24 machine guns, 19 guns were missing in the division; it was disbanded) and partially - also the disbanded 72nd Infantry Division and the 76th Artillery Brigade (lost without categorization only 25 officers, 1,100 soldiers, 40 guns).

First Battle of the Masurian Lakes was the development and continuation of the plan of the command of the German 8th Army to destroy the Russian armies invading East Prussia. P. von Hindenburg and E. Ludendorff decided to repeat the encirclement operation, organizing a powerful strike at the junction of the 1st and 10th Russian armies with access to the rear of the 1st. The German 8th Army lost for the whole of September 1914 (more accurate data is not available) 1,555 dead, 10,412 wounded and 1,552 missing. More than 30,000 Russian prisoners and 150 guns were announced to have been captured.

In the battles of September 7–15, emphasis was placed on the qualitative superiority of the German troops in artillery, on maneuvering with fire. The Russian troops were not ready for this, and their defense could not withstand the long artillery preparations that had not been used before. Nevertheless, the 1st Army was not surrounded. The firmness of the defense on the Angerapp River made it possible to fend off the maneuver of the German cavalry and prevent it from destroying the headquarters and rear of the army. However, the actions of Rennenkampf were dissatisfied. Vasily Flug angrily wrote to the Chief of Staff of the armies of the North-Western Front V. Oranovsky: "The catastrophe with Samsonov made such a deep impression that we want to avoid any action involving even the smallest risk, forgetting that there is no victory without risk. To justify our indecision, we put forward the colossal numbers of troops that the enemy allegedly has ... The Germans seem to us ubiquitous".

Having lost 321 officers, 14,585 soldiers, 31 machine guns, 30 guns, the 72nd Infantry Division was disbanded, its commander, Major General Orlov, was transferred to the reserve ranks. Head of the 30th Infantry Division, Lieutenant General Eduard Kolyankovsky, commander of the 28th Artillery Brigade, Major General V. Mallio, head of the 1st Separate Cavalry Brigade, Major General N. Oranovsky, commanders of the 110th, 112th, 113th, 117th, 169th, 223rd, 287th, 288th Infantry, 16th Irkutsk Hussars, 34th Don Cossack regiments were removed from their posts.

== Сonsequences of the Russian occupation of East Prussia ==
The rule of the Russian occupation authorities in East Prussia caused great damage to the province. The victims of the Russian troops were 19,000 civilians, of which 1,620 died (including those who were shot without trial), 433 were wounded and 10,000 were driven to Russia (5,419 men, mainly the elderly, 2,587 women and 2,719 children).

33,553 houses were destroyed or partially destroyed, 100,000 Germans were left homeless and without property. A third of the population of the province – 800,000 people – became refugees. Twenty-four cities, 572 villages, 236 estates were destroyed. Russian troops stole 135,000 horses, 250,000 cattle (later 20,000 horses and 86,000 cattle were recaptured), and 200,000 pigs.

The robbery was led by the military department, which created a special commission on the basis of the commissariat of the Dvina military district. All the "confiscated" property was brought to Vilna, where the applications of "interested parties" for a share of the loot were sent. Agricultural machinery and implements, machine tools, personal items, clothes, underwear and footwear (including women's and children's), furniture, sanitary ware (bathtubs, toilet bowls), watches, cutlery were subject to confiscation. In total, the list, compiled later for the chief of staff of the Dvina military district, includes 697 positions of various items (regardless of their number in each item). These consequences of the war, characteristic, however, for each of the fighting armies, contributed to the bitterness of the struggle. At the end of 1914 in Germany, Russian generals taken prisoner were brought to trial for crimes against civilians. The court acquitted them, as they carried out the orders of their superiors.

Almost immediately after the liberation of the province, Emperor Wilhelm II arrived in East Prussia. He visited Lötzen, other cities, was in the immediate rear of the 8th Army. On October 7, 15 million marks were allocated for the restoration of the province. In addition to the state, the organization "Help to East Prussia" made a huge contribution. Union of German Societies for Post-War Aid to Destroyed East Prussian Cities and Towns, which collected millions in donations. Many cities and districts of Germany took patronage over the destroyed settlements and regions of the province. For example, Schirwindt received assistance from Bremen, Ortelsburg from Berlin-Wilmersdorf and Vienna, and Stallupenen from Kassel.

== Outcome ==
On 11 September, Grand Duke Nikolai dismissed Yakov Zhilinsky as the commander of the Russian Northwestern Front, replacing him with Nikolai Ruzsky. The Grand Duke then ordered the 5th Army from Galicia to a position north of Warsaw.

On 14 September, the last of the Russian army had retreated over the frontier, as the German 1st Infantry Division reached Wyłkowyszki, within Russian territory, and the German 3rd Reserve Infantry Division had reached Suvalki.

On 15 September, the Germans formed the 9th Army to protect Silesia.

The German advantage was bought at a cost: the newly arrived corps had been sent from the Western front and their absence would be felt in the upcoming Battle of the Marne. Much of the territory taken by the Germans would later be lost to a Russian counterattack during 25–28 September.

== See also ==
- Second Russian invasion of East Prussia (1914)
- Second Battle of the Masurian Lakes

== Sources ==
- Nelipovich, Sergei (2017). Русский фронт Первой Мировой войны: потери сторон 1914 [The Russian Front of the First World War: the losses of the sides in 1914]. Moscow: Квадрига. ISBN 978-5-91791-238-7.
- Oleynikov, Alexei (2016). Россия-щит Антанты [Russia-Shield of Entente]. Foreword by Nikolai Starikov. St.Petersburg: Piter. ISBN 978-5-496-01795-4.
- Golovin, Nikolai (2014). Россия в Первой мировой войне [Russia in First World War]. Вече. ISBN 978-5-4444-1667-9.
- Tucker, Spencer (2002). The Great War 1914-1918. UCL Press. ISBN 1-85728-390-2.
- Airapetov, Oleg (2014). Участие Российской империи в Первой Мировой Войне: 1914 [Participation of the Russian Empire in the First World War: 1914] (in Russian). Кучуково поле. ISBN 978-5-9950-0402-8.
- Nelipovich, Sergei G. (2023). Два похода. Борьба за Восточную Пруссию в августе-октябре 1914 [Two campaigns. The Struggle for East Prussia in August–October 1914]. Забытые войны России (in Russian). Moscow: Квадрига. ISBN 978-5-91791-376-6.
