= General of the Artillery (Germany) =

Former branch general rank in the German Army

General of the Artillery General der Artillerie
- Shoulder board insignia

- Arabesque gorget patch insignia
- Country: German Empire: Kingdom of Prussia; Kingdom of Bavaria; Kingdom of Saxony; Kingdom of Württemberg; Weimar Republic Nazi Germany
- Service branch: Imperial German Army; Prussian Army; Bavarian Army (Kingdom of Saxony) Saxon Army; Royal Württemberg Army; Reichsheer; German Army
- Rank: Three-star
- NATO rank code: OF-8
- Non-NATO rank: O-9
- Next higher rank: Generaloberst
- Next lower rank: Generalleutnant
- Equivalent ranks: See list

General der Artillerie (en: General of the artillery) may mean:

A rank of three-star general, comparable to modern armed forces OF-8 grade, in the Imperial German Army and its contingency armies of Prussia, Bavaria, Saxony and Württemberg. It also was used in the Reichswehr and the Wehrmacht. The second-highest regular rank below Generaloberst; cavalry officers of equivalent rank were called general of the cavalry, and infantry officers of equivalent rank general of the infantry. The Wehrmacht also had General der Panzertruppen (tank troops), General der Gebirgstruppen (mountain troops), General der Pioniere (engineers), General der Nachrichtentruppen (communications troops) and several branch variants for the Luftwaffe.

junior Rank; Generalleutnant	(German officer rank); General der Artillerie	senior Rank; Generaloberst

In the modern Bundeswehr, General der Artillerie is the position of an artillery officer responsible for certain questions of troop training and equipment, usually with the rank of Brigadegenerals. The position of general of the artillery is connected with that of commander of the artillery school. Corresponding service positions also exist for other branches of the army. Since in this usage it refers to a position not a rank, an Oberst is sometimes "General of" his respective type of troops. The form of address is usually Herr General and/or Herr Oberst; the form of address Herr General der Artillerie is unorthodox, since it does not refer to a rank.

Today in the Bundeswehr, the rank of lieutenant general corresponds to the traditional rank of general of the artillery. There was no equivalent rank in the army of East Germany, where it was merged into that of Generaloberst.

== A ==
- Alexander Andrae (1888–1979)
- Maximilian de Angelis (1889–1974)

== B ==
- Paul Bader (1883–1971)
- Anton Reichard von Mauchenheim genannt Bechtolsheim (1896–1961)
- Karl Becker (1879–1940), Heereswaffenamt
- Hans Behlendorff (1889–1961)
- Wilhelm Berlin (1889–1987)
- Friedrich von Boetticher (1881–1967)
- Hans von Bülow (1816-1897)

== C ==
- Eduard Crasemann (1891–1950)

== E ==
- Theodor Endres (1876–1956)
- Erwin Engelbrecht (1891–1964)

== F ==
- Wilhelm Fahrmbacher (1888–1970)
- Maximilian Felzmann (1894–1962)
- Maximilian Fretter-Pico (1892–1984)
- Werner von Fritsch (1880–1939); later Generaloberst

== G ==
- Curt Gallenkamp (1890–1958)
- Max von Gallwitz (1852–1937)
- Theodor Geib (1888–1944)
- Hans von Gronau (1850–1940)

== H ==
- Christian Hansen (1885–1972)
- Otto Hartmann (1884–1952)
- Walter Hartmann (1891–1977)
- Friedrich-Wilhelm Hauck (1897–1979)
- Ernst-Eberhard Hell (1887–1973)
- Kurt Herzog (1889–1948)
- Maximilian Ritter von Höhn (1859–1936)
- Prince Kraft of Hohenlohe-Ingelfingen (1827–1892)

== J ==
- Wilhelm Keitel (1882 – 1946); later Generalfeldmarschall
- Curt Jahn (1892–1966)
- Alfred Jodl (1890 – 1946); later Generaloberst

== K ==
- Rudolf Kaempfe (1893–1962)
- Leonhard Kaupisch (1878–1945)
- Walter Keiner (1890–1978)
- Konrad Krafft von Dellmensingen (1862–1953)
- Friedrich Freiherr Kress von Kressenstein (1870–1948)
- Georg von Küchler (1881–1968), later Generalfeldmarschall

== L ==
- Emil Leeb (1881–1969)
- Eduard von Lewinski (1829–1906)
- Fritz Lindemann (1890–1944)
- Christian Nicolaus von Linger (1669–1755), first officer to hold the rank of General of the Artillery in the Prussian Army
- Herbert Loch (1886–1976)
- Walter Lucht (1882–1949)
- Max Ludwig (1871–1961)

== M ==
- Erich Marcks (1891–1944)
- Robert Martinek (1889–1944)
- Horst von Mellenthin (1898–1977)
- Heinrich Meyer-Buerdorf (1888-1971)
- Willi Moser (1887–1946)
- Eugen Müller (1891–1951)

== O ==
- Herbert Osterkamp (1894–1959)

== P ==
- Walter Petzel (1883–1965)
- Max Pfeffer (1883–1955)
- Georg Pfeiffer (1890–1944)

== R ==
- Friedrich von Rabenau (1884–1945); killed in a concentration camp
- Antoni Wilhelm Radziwiłł (1833–1904)
- Walther von Reichenau (1884–1942); later Generalfeldmarschall
- Rudolf Freiherr von Roman (1893–1970)

== S ==
- Friedrich von Scholtz (1851–1927)
- Walther von Seydlitz-Kurzbach (1888–1976)
- Johann Sinnhuber (1887–1979)
- Hermann Ritter von Speck (1888–1940)
- Hans Speth (1897–1985)
- Hermann von Stein (1854–1927)
- Wilhelm Stemmermann (1888–1944)

== T ==
- Gerhard Tappen (1866–1953); by brevet
- Siegfried Paul Leonhard Thomaschki (1894–1967)
- Johann Nepomuk von Triva (1755–1827)

== V ==
- Alfred von Vollard-Bockelberg (1874–1945), Heereswaffenamt

== W ==
- Kurt Waeger (1893–1952)
- Eduard Wagner (1894–1944), Generalquartiermeister des Heeres, committed suicide
- Martin Wandel (1892–1943)
- Walter Warlimont (1894–1976)
- Helmuth Weidling (1891–1955), later Kampfkommandant of Berlin Defense Area
- Albert Wodrig (1883–1972)
- Rolf Wuthmann (1893–1977)

== Z ==
- Heinz Ziegler (1894–1972)

== See also ==
- General (Germany)
- General of the branch
- Military ranks of the German Empire
- Military ranks of the Weimar Republic
- Ranks and insignia of the German Army (1935–1945)
