= German Army order of battle, Western Front (1918) =

WWI German military order

This is the German Army order of battle on the Western Front at the close of the war.

The overall commander of the Imperial German Army was Kaiser Wilhelm II, but real power resided with The Chief of the General Staff, Generalfeldmarschall Paul von Hindenburg, and his First Quartermaster, General der Infanterie Erich Ludendorff.

== Order of battle ==
The German Army on the Western Front on 30 October 1918 was organised as 4 army groups (Heeresgruppe) controlling 13 army-level commands.

=== Heeresgruppe Kronprinz Rupprecht ===
Army Group	Army	Corps	Division
Heeresgruppe Kronprinz Rupprecht; Generalfeldmarschall; Rupprecht, Crown Prince of Bavaria	4th Army; General der Infanterie; Friedrich Sixt von Armin	Naval Corps	1st Naval Division
Heeresgruppe Kronprinz Rupprecht; Generalfeldmarschall; Rupprecht, Crown Prince of Bavaria	4th Army; General der Infanterie; Friedrich Sixt von Armin	Naval Corps	2nd Naval Division
Heeresgruppe Kronprinz Rupprecht; Generalfeldmarschall; Rupprecht, Crown Prince of Bavaria	4th Army; General der Infanterie; Friedrich Sixt von Armin	Naval Corps	two thirds 38th Landwehr Division
Heeresgruppe Kronprinz Rupprecht; Generalfeldmarschall; Rupprecht, Crown Prince of Bavaria	4th Army; General der Infanterie; Friedrich Sixt von Armin	Naval Corps	one third 3rd Division
Heeresgruppe Kronprinz Rupprecht; Generalfeldmarschall; Rupprecht, Crown Prince of Bavaria	4th Army; General der Infanterie; Friedrich Sixt von Armin	Naval Corps	85th Landwehr Division
Heeresgruppe Kronprinz Rupprecht; Generalfeldmarschall; Rupprecht, Crown Prince of Bavaria	4th Army; General der Infanterie; Friedrich Sixt von Armin	Guards Reserve Corps	3rd Reserve Division
Heeresgruppe Kronprinz Rupprecht; Generalfeldmarschall; Rupprecht, Crown Prince of Bavaria	4th Army; General der Infanterie; Friedrich Sixt von Armin	Guards Reserve Corps	two thirds 3rd Division
Heeresgruppe Kronprinz Rupprecht; Generalfeldmarschall; Rupprecht, Crown Prince of Bavaria	4th Army; General der Infanterie; Friedrich Sixt von Armin	Guards Reserve Corps	13th Reserve Division
Heeresgruppe Kronprinz Rupprecht; Generalfeldmarschall; Rupprecht, Crown Prince of Bavaria	4th Army; General der Infanterie; Friedrich Sixt von Armin	Guards Reserve Corps	16th Bavarian Division
Heeresgruppe Kronprinz Rupprecht; Generalfeldmarschall; Rupprecht, Crown Prince of Bavaria	4th Army; General der Infanterie; Friedrich Sixt von Armin	Guards Reserve Corps	36th Reserve Division
Heeresgruppe Kronprinz Rupprecht; Generalfeldmarschall; Rupprecht, Crown Prince of Bavaria	4th Army; General der Infanterie; Friedrich Sixt von Armin	Guards Reserve Corps	11th Bavarian Division
Heeresgruppe Kronprinz Rupprecht; Generalfeldmarschall; Rupprecht, Crown Prince of Bavaria	4th Army; General der Infanterie; Friedrich Sixt von Armin	Guards Reserve Corps	4th Division
Heeresgruppe Kronprinz Rupprecht; Generalfeldmarschall; Rupprecht, Crown Prince of Bavaria	4th Army; General der Infanterie; Friedrich Sixt von Armin	Guards Reserve Corps	one third 38th Landwehr Division
Heeresgruppe Kronprinz Rupprecht; Generalfeldmarschall; Rupprecht, Crown Prince of Bavaria	4th Army; General der Infanterie; Friedrich Sixt von Armin	Guards Reserve Corps	16th Reserve Division
Heeresgruppe Kronprinz Rupprecht; Generalfeldmarschall; Rupprecht, Crown Prince of Bavaria	4th Army; General der Infanterie; Friedrich Sixt von Armin	Guards Reserve Corps	23rd Division
Heeresgruppe Kronprinz Rupprecht; Generalfeldmarschall; Rupprecht, Crown Prince of Bavaria	4th Army; General der Infanterie; Friedrich Sixt von Armin	Guards Reserve Corps	3rd Landwehr Division
Heeresgruppe Kronprinz Rupprecht; Generalfeldmarschall; Rupprecht, Crown Prince of Bavaria	4th Army; General der Infanterie; Friedrich Sixt von Armin	Guards Corps	26th Division
Heeresgruppe Kronprinz Rupprecht; Generalfeldmarschall; Rupprecht, Crown Prince of Bavaria	4th Army; General der Infanterie; Friedrich Sixt von Armin	Guards Corps	19th Division
Heeresgruppe Kronprinz Rupprecht; Generalfeldmarschall; Rupprecht, Crown Prince of Bavaria	4th Army; General der Infanterie; Friedrich Sixt von Armin	Guards Corps	Guards Ersatz Division
Heeresgruppe Kronprinz Rupprecht; Generalfeldmarschall; Rupprecht, Crown Prince of Bavaria	4th Army; General der Infanterie; Friedrich Sixt von Armin	Guards Corps	207th Division
Heeresgruppe Kronprinz Rupprecht; Generalfeldmarschall; Rupprecht, Crown Prince of Bavaria	4th Army; General der Infanterie; Friedrich Sixt von Armin	Guards Corps	1st Bavarian Reserve Division
Heeresgruppe Kronprinz Rupprecht; Generalfeldmarschall; Rupprecht, Crown Prince of Bavaria	4th Army; General der Infanterie; Friedrich Sixt von Armin	Guards Corps	21st Division
Heeresgruppe Kronprinz Rupprecht; Generalfeldmarschall; Rupprecht, Crown Prince of Bavaria	4th Army; General der Infanterie; Friedrich Sixt von Armin	Guards Corps	52nd Reserve Division
Heeresgruppe Kronprinz Rupprecht; Generalfeldmarschall; Rupprecht, Crown Prince of Bavaria	4th Army; General der Infanterie; Friedrich Sixt von Armin	Guards Corps	6th Cavalry Schützen Division
Heeresgruppe Kronprinz Rupprecht; Generalfeldmarschall; Rupprecht, Crown Prince of Bavaria	4th Army; General der Infanterie; Friedrich Sixt von Armin	X Reserve Corps	49th Reserve Division
Heeresgruppe Kronprinz Rupprecht; Generalfeldmarschall; Rupprecht, Crown Prince of Bavaria	4th Army; General der Infanterie; Friedrich Sixt von Armin	X Reserve Corps	23rd Reserve Division
Heeresgruppe Kronprinz Rupprecht; Generalfeldmarschall; Rupprecht, Crown Prince of Bavaria	4th Army; General der Infanterie; Friedrich Sixt von Armin	X Reserve Corps	11th Reserve Division
Heeresgruppe Kronprinz Rupprecht; Generalfeldmarschall; Rupprecht, Crown Prince of Bavaria	4th Army; General der Infanterie; Friedrich Sixt von Armin	X Reserve Corps	56th Division
Heeresgruppe Kronprinz Rupprecht; Generalfeldmarschall; Rupprecht, Crown Prince of Bavaria	4th Army; General der Infanterie; Friedrich Sixt von Armin	X Reserve Corps	6th Bavarian Reserve Division
Heeresgruppe Kronprinz Rupprecht; Generalfeldmarschall; Rupprecht, Crown Prince of Bavaria	4th Army; General der Infanterie; Friedrich Sixt von Armin	X Reserve Corps	39th Division
Heeresgruppe Kronprinz Rupprecht; Generalfeldmarschall; Rupprecht, Crown Prince of Bavaria	4th Army; General der Infanterie; Friedrich Sixt von Armin	X Reserve Corps	40th Division
Heeresgruppe Kronprinz Rupprecht; Generalfeldmarschall; Rupprecht, Crown Prince of Bavaria	6th Army; General der Infanterie; Ferdinand von Quast	55th Corps (z.b.V.)	38th Division
Heeresgruppe Kronprinz Rupprecht; Generalfeldmarschall; Rupprecht, Crown Prince of Bavaria	6th Army; General der Infanterie; Ferdinand von Quast	55th Corps (z.b.V.)	12th Bavarian Division
Heeresgruppe Kronprinz Rupprecht; Generalfeldmarschall; Rupprecht, Crown Prince of Bavaria	6th Army; General der Infanterie; Ferdinand von Quast	55th Corps (z.b.V.)	5th Bavarian Division
Heeresgruppe Kronprinz Rupprecht; Generalfeldmarschall; Rupprecht, Crown Prince of Bavaria	6th Army; General der Infanterie; Ferdinand von Quast	55th Corps (z.b.V.)	two thirds 4th Ersatz Division
Heeresgruppe Kronprinz Rupprecht; Generalfeldmarschall; Rupprecht, Crown Prince of Bavaria	6th Army; General der Infanterie; Ferdinand von Quast	55th Corps (z.b.V.)	9th Reserve Division
Heeresgruppe Kronprinz Rupprecht; Generalfeldmarschall; Rupprecht, Crown Prince of Bavaria	6th Army; General der Infanterie; Ferdinand von Quast	IV Corps	2nd Guards Reserve Division
Heeresgruppe Kronprinz Rupprecht; Generalfeldmarschall; Rupprecht, Crown Prince of Bavaria	6th Army; General der Infanterie; Ferdinand von Quast	IV Corps	one third 4th Ersatz Division
Heeresgruppe Kronprinz Rupprecht; Generalfeldmarschall; Rupprecht, Crown Prince of Bavaria	6th Army; General der Infanterie; Ferdinand von Quast	IV Corps	36th Division
Heeresgruppe Kronprinz Rupprecht; Generalfeldmarschall; Rupprecht, Crown Prince of Bavaria	6th Army; General der Infanterie; Ferdinand von Quast	XXXX Reserve Corps	16th Division
Heeresgruppe Kronprinz Rupprecht; Generalfeldmarschall; Rupprecht, Crown Prince of Bavaria	6th Army; General der Infanterie; Ferdinand von Quast	XXXX Reserve Corps	8th Division
Heeresgruppe Kronprinz Rupprecht; Generalfeldmarschall; Rupprecht, Crown Prince of Bavaria	6th Army; General der Infanterie; Ferdinand von Quast	XI Corps	No units assigned
Heeresgruppe Kronprinz Rupprecht; Generalfeldmarschall; Rupprecht, Crown Prince of Bavaria	17th Army; General der Infanterie; Bruno von Mudra	I Bavarian Reserve Corps	187th Division
Heeresgruppe Kronprinz Rupprecht; Generalfeldmarschall; Rupprecht, Crown Prince of Bavaria	17th Army; General der Infanterie; Bruno von Mudra	I Bavarian Reserve Corps	26th Reserve Division
Heeresgruppe Kronprinz Rupprecht; Generalfeldmarschall; Rupprecht, Crown Prince of Bavaria	17th Army; General der Infanterie; Bruno von Mudra	I Bavarian Reserve Corps	10th Ersatz Division
Heeresgruppe Kronprinz Rupprecht; Generalfeldmarschall; Rupprecht, Crown Prince of Bavaria	17th Army; General der Infanterie; Bruno von Mudra	I Bavarian Reserve Corps	208th Division
Heeresgruppe Kronprinz Rupprecht; Generalfeldmarschall; Rupprecht, Crown Prince of Bavaria	17th Army; General der Infanterie; Bruno von Mudra	II Bavarian Corps	234th Division
Heeresgruppe Kronprinz Rupprecht; Generalfeldmarschall; Rupprecht, Crown Prince of Bavaria	17th Army; General der Infanterie; Bruno von Mudra	II Bavarian Corps	25th Division
Heeresgruppe Kronprinz Rupprecht; Generalfeldmarschall; Rupprecht, Crown Prince of Bavaria	17th Army; General der Infanterie; Bruno von Mudra	XVIII Corps	220th Division
Heeresgruppe Kronprinz Rupprecht; Generalfeldmarschall; Rupprecht, Crown Prince of Bavaria	17th Army; General der Infanterie; Bruno von Mudra	XVIII Corps	35th Division
Heeresgruppe Kronprinz Rupprecht; Generalfeldmarschall; Rupprecht, Crown Prince of Bavaria	17th Army; General der Infanterie; Bruno von Mudra	XVIII Corps	6th Division
Heeresgruppe Kronprinz Rupprecht; Generalfeldmarschall; Rupprecht, Crown Prince of Bavaria	17th Army; General der Infanterie; Bruno von Mudra	XIV Reserve Corps	214th Division
Heeresgruppe Kronprinz Rupprecht; Generalfeldmarschall; Rupprecht, Crown Prince of Bavaria	17th Army; General der Infanterie; Bruno von Mudra	XIV Reserve Corps	111th Division
Heeresgruppe Kronprinz Rupprecht; Generalfeldmarschall; Rupprecht, Crown Prince of Bavaria	17th Army; General der Infanterie; Bruno von Mudra	XIV Reserve Corps	48th Reserve Division
Heeresgruppe Kronprinz Rupprecht; Generalfeldmarschall; Rupprecht, Crown Prince of Bavaria	17th Army; General der Infanterie; Bruno von Mudra	XIV Reserve Corps	206th Division
Heeresgruppe Kronprinz Rupprecht; Generalfeldmarschall; Rupprecht, Crown Prince of Bavaria	17th Army; General der Infanterie; Bruno von Mudra	XIV Reserve Corps	12th Division
Heeresgruppe Kronprinz Rupprecht; Generalfeldmarschall; Rupprecht, Crown Prince of Bavaria	17th Army; General der Infanterie; Bruno von Mudra	XIV Reserve Corps	28th Reserve Division
Heeresgruppe Kronprinz Rupprecht; Generalfeldmarschall; Rupprecht, Crown Prince of Bavaria	2nd Army; General der Infanterie; Adolph von Carlowitz	54th Corps (z.b.V.)	21st Reserve Division
Heeresgruppe Kronprinz Rupprecht; Generalfeldmarschall; Rupprecht, Crown Prince of Bavaria	2nd Army; General der Infanterie; Adolph von Carlowitz	54th Corps (z.b.V.)	22nd Division
Heeresgruppe Kronprinz Rupprecht; Generalfeldmarschall; Rupprecht, Crown Prince of Bavaria	2nd Army; General der Infanterie; Adolph von Carlowitz	54th Corps (z.b.V.)	4th Division
Heeresgruppe Kronprinz Rupprecht; Generalfeldmarschall; Rupprecht, Crown Prince of Bavaria	2nd Army; General der Infanterie; Adolph von Carlowitz	54th Corps (z.b.V.)	113th Division
Heeresgruppe Kronprinz Rupprecht; Generalfeldmarschall; Rupprecht, Crown Prince of Bavaria	2nd Army; General der Infanterie; Adolph von Carlowitz	54th Corps (z.b.V.)	239th Division
Heeresgruppe Kronprinz Rupprecht; Generalfeldmarschall; Rupprecht, Crown Prince of Bavaria	2nd Army; General der Infanterie; Adolph von Carlowitz	54th Corps (z.b.V.)	12th Reserve Division
Heeresgruppe Kronprinz Rupprecht; Generalfeldmarschall; Rupprecht, Crown Prince of Bavaria	2nd Army; General der Infanterie; Adolph von Carlowitz	54th Corps (z.b.V.)	Jäger Division
Heeresgruppe Kronprinz Rupprecht; Generalfeldmarschall; Rupprecht, Crown Prince of Bavaria	2nd Army; General der Infanterie; Adolph von Carlowitz	54th Corps (z.b.V.)	185th Division
Heeresgruppe Kronprinz Rupprecht; Generalfeldmarschall; Rupprecht, Crown Prince of Bavaria	2nd Army; General der Infanterie; Adolph von Carlowitz	IV Reserve Corps	14th Division
Heeresgruppe Kronprinz Rupprecht; Generalfeldmarschall; Rupprecht, Crown Prince of Bavaria	2nd Army; General der Infanterie; Adolph von Carlowitz	IV Reserve Corps	58th Division
Heeresgruppe Kronprinz Rupprecht; Generalfeldmarschall; Rupprecht, Crown Prince of Bavaria	2nd Army; General der Infanterie; Adolph von Carlowitz	IV Reserve Corps	18th Reserve Division
Heeresgruppe Kronprinz Rupprecht; Generalfeldmarschall; Rupprecht, Crown Prince of Bavaria	2nd Army; General der Infanterie; Adolph von Carlowitz	IV Reserve Corps	30th Division
Heeresgruppe Kronprinz Rupprecht; Generalfeldmarschall; Rupprecht, Crown Prince of Bavaria	2nd Army; General der Infanterie; Adolph von Carlowitz	IV Reserve Corps	44th Reserve Division
Heeresgruppe Kronprinz Rupprecht; Generalfeldmarschall; Rupprecht, Crown Prince of Bavaria	2nd Army; General der Infanterie; Adolph von Carlowitz	51st Corps (z.b.V.)	2nd Cyclist Brigade
Heeresgruppe Kronprinz Rupprecht; Generalfeldmarschall; Rupprecht, Crown Prince of Bavaria	2nd Army; General der Infanterie; Adolph von Carlowitz	51st Corps (z.b.V.)	243rd Division
Heeresgruppe Kronprinz Rupprecht; Generalfeldmarschall; Rupprecht, Crown Prince of Bavaria	2nd Army; General der Infanterie; Adolph von Carlowitz	51st Corps (z.b.V.)	121st Division
Heeresgruppe Kronprinz Rupprecht; Generalfeldmarschall; Rupprecht, Crown Prince of Bavaria	2nd Army; General der Infanterie; Adolph von Carlowitz	51st Corps (z.b.V.)	54th Division
Heeresgruppe Kronprinz Rupprecht; Generalfeldmarschall; Rupprecht, Crown Prince of Bavaria	2nd Army; General der Infanterie; Adolph von Carlowitz	51st Corps (z.b.V.)	1st Guards Reserve Division
Heeresgruppe Kronprinz Rupprecht; Generalfeldmarschall; Rupprecht, Crown Prince of Bavaria	2nd Army; General der Infanterie; Adolph von Carlowitz	51st Corps (z.b.V.)	22nd Reserve Division
Heeresgruppe Kronprinz Rupprecht; Generalfeldmarschall; Rupprecht, Crown Prince of Bavaria	2nd Army; General der Infanterie; Adolph von Carlowitz	Under Army command	17th Reserve Division

=== Heeresgruppe Deutscher Kronprinz ===
Army Group	Army	Corps	Division
Heeresgruppe Deutscher Kronprinz; General der Infanterie; Wilhelm, Crown Prince of Germany	18th Army; General der Infanterie; Oskar von Hutier	I Bavarian Corps	19th Reserve Division
Heeresgruppe Deutscher Kronprinz; General der Infanterie; Wilhelm, Crown Prince of Germany	18th Army; General der Infanterie; Oskar von Hutier	I Bavarian Corps	29th Division
Heeresgruppe Deutscher Kronprinz; General der Infanterie; Wilhelm, Crown Prince of Germany	18th Army; General der Infanterie; Oskar von Hutier	I Bavarian Corps	15th Reserve Division
Heeresgruppe Deutscher Kronprinz; General der Infanterie; Wilhelm, Crown Prince of Germany	18th Army; General der Infanterie; Oskar von Hutier	I Bavarian Corps	200th Division
Heeresgruppe Deutscher Kronprinz; General der Infanterie; Wilhelm, Crown Prince of Germany	18th Army; General der Infanterie; Oskar von Hutier	I Bavarian Corps	204th Division
Heeresgruppe Deutscher Kronprinz; General der Infanterie; Wilhelm, Crown Prince of Germany	18th Army; General der Infanterie; Oskar von Hutier	I Bavarian Corps	34th Division
Heeresgruppe Deutscher Kronprinz; General der Infanterie; Wilhelm, Crown Prince of Germany	18th Army; General der Infanterie; Oskar von Hutier	XXVI Reserve Corps	75th Reserve Division
Heeresgruppe Deutscher Kronprinz; General der Infanterie; Wilhelm, Crown Prince of Germany	18th Army; General der Infanterie; Oskar von Hutier	XXVI Reserve Corps	9th Division
Heeresgruppe Deutscher Kronprinz; General der Infanterie; Wilhelm, Crown Prince of Germany	18th Army; General der Infanterie; Oskar von Hutier	XXVI Reserve Corps	18th Division
Heeresgruppe Deutscher Kronprinz; General der Infanterie; Wilhelm, Crown Prince of Germany	18th Army; General der Infanterie; Oskar von Hutier	XXVI Reserve Corps	6th Bavarian Division
Heeresgruppe Deutscher Kronprinz; General der Infanterie; Wilhelm, Crown Prince of Germany	18th Army; General der Infanterie; Oskar von Hutier	XVIII Reserve Corps	231st Division
Heeresgruppe Deutscher Kronprinz; General der Infanterie; Wilhelm, Crown Prince of Germany	18th Army; General der Infanterie; Oskar von Hutier	XVIII Reserve Corps	238th Division
Heeresgruppe Deutscher Kronprinz; General der Infanterie; Wilhelm, Crown Prince of Germany	18th Army; General der Infanterie; Oskar von Hutier	XVIII Reserve Corps	81st Reserve Division
Heeresgruppe Deutscher Kronprinz; General der Infanterie; Wilhelm, Crown Prince of Germany	18th Army; General der Infanterie; Oskar von Hutier	XVIII Reserve Corps	2nd Division
Heeresgruppe Deutscher Kronprinz; General der Infanterie; Wilhelm, Crown Prince of Germany	18th Army; General der Infanterie; Oskar von Hutier	XVIII Reserve Corps	1st Reserve Division
Heeresgruppe Deutscher Kronprinz; General der Infanterie; Wilhelm, Crown Prince of Germany	18th Army; General der Infanterie; Oskar von Hutier	XVIII Reserve Corps	two thirds of 82nd Reserve Division
Heeresgruppe Deutscher Kronprinz; General der Infanterie; Wilhelm, Crown Prince of Germany	18th Army; General der Infanterie; Oskar von Hutier	XVIII Reserve Corps	5th Reserve Division
Heeresgruppe Deutscher Kronprinz; General der Infanterie; Wilhelm, Crown Prince of Germany	18th Army; General der Infanterie; Oskar von Hutier	XIV Corps	232nd Division
Heeresgruppe Deutscher Kronprinz; General der Infanterie; Wilhelm, Crown Prince of Germany	18th Army; General der Infanterie; Oskar von Hutier	XIV Corps	237th Division
Heeresgruppe Deutscher Kronprinz; General der Infanterie; Wilhelm, Crown Prince of Germany	18th Army; General der Infanterie; Oskar von Hutier	XIV Corps	11th Division
Heeresgruppe Deutscher Kronprinz; General der Infanterie; Wilhelm, Crown Prince of Germany	18th Army; General der Infanterie; Oskar von Hutier	XIV Corps	221st Division
Heeresgruppe Deutscher Kronprinz; General der Infanterie; Wilhelm, Crown Prince of Germany	18th Army; General der Infanterie; Oskar von Hutier	XIV Corps	105th Division
Heeresgruppe Deutscher Kronprinz; General der Infanterie; Wilhelm, Crown Prince of Germany	18th Army; General der Infanterie; Oskar von Hutier	XIV Corps	87th Division
Heeresgruppe Deutscher Kronprinz; General der Infanterie; Wilhelm, Crown Prince of Germany	7th Army; Generaloberst; Max von Boehn	XVII Corps	24th Reserve Division
Heeresgruppe Deutscher Kronprinz; General der Infanterie; Wilhelm, Crown Prince of Germany	7th Army; Generaloberst; Max von Boehn	XVII Corps	86th Division
Heeresgruppe Deutscher Kronprinz; General der Infanterie; Wilhelm, Crown Prince of Germany	7th Army; Generaloberst; Max von Boehn	XVII Corps	one third of 10th Reserve Division
Heeresgruppe Deutscher Kronprinz; General der Infanterie; Wilhelm, Crown Prince of Germany	7th Army; Generaloberst; Max von Boehn	III Corps	one third of 10th Reserve Division
Heeresgruppe Deutscher Kronprinz; General der Infanterie; Wilhelm, Crown Prince of Germany	7th Army; Generaloberst; Max von Boehn	III Corps	26th Division
Heeresgruppe Deutscher Kronprinz; General der Infanterie; Wilhelm, Crown Prince of Germany	7th Army; Generaloberst; Max von Boehn	III Corps	227th Division
Heeresgruppe Deutscher Kronprinz; General der Infanterie; Wilhelm, Crown Prince of Germany	7th Army; Generaloberst; Max von Boehn	III Corps	3rd Naval Division
Heeresgruppe Deutscher Kronprinz; General der Infanterie; Wilhelm, Crown Prince of Germany	7th Army; Generaloberst; Max von Boehn	VIII Reserve Corps	84th Division
Heeresgruppe Deutscher Kronprinz; General der Infanterie; Wilhelm, Crown Prince of Germany	7th Army; Generaloberst; Max von Boehn	VIII Reserve Corps	19th Division
Heeresgruppe Deutscher Kronprinz; General der Infanterie; Wilhelm, Crown Prince of Germany	7th Army; Generaloberst; Max von Boehn	VIII Reserve Corps	2nd Bavarian Division
Heeresgruppe Deutscher Kronprinz; General der Infanterie; Wilhelm, Crown Prince of Germany	7th Army; Generaloberst; Max von Boehn	VIII Reserve Corps	one third of 10th Reserve Division
Heeresgruppe Deutscher Kronprinz; General der Infanterie; Wilhelm, Crown Prince of Germany	7th Army; Generaloberst; Max von Boehn	65th Corps (z.b.V.)	5th Division
Heeresgruppe Deutscher Kronprinz; General der Infanterie; Wilhelm, Crown Prince of Germany	7th Army; Generaloberst; Max von Boehn	65th Corps (z.b.V.)	4th Guards Division
Heeresgruppe Deutscher Kronprinz; General der Infanterie; Wilhelm, Crown Prince of Germany	7th Army; Generaloberst; Max von Boehn	65th Corps (z.b.V.)	216th Division
Heeresgruppe Deutscher Kronprinz; General der Infanterie; Wilhelm, Crown Prince of Germany	7th Army; Generaloberst; Max von Boehn	65th Corps (z.b.V.)	50th Division
Heeresgruppe Deutscher Kronprinz; General der Infanterie; Wilhelm, Crown Prince of Germany	7th Army; Generaloberst; Max von Boehn	VII Corps	No units assigned
Heeresgruppe Deutscher Kronprinz; General der Infanterie; Wilhelm, Crown Prince of Germany	7th Army; Generaloberst; Max von Boehn	Moving to Armee-Abteilung A	24th Division
Heeresgruppe Deutscher Kronprinz; General der Infanterie; Wilhelm, Crown Prince of Germany	1st Army; General der Infanterie; Otto von Below	VII Reserve Corps	1st Division
Heeresgruppe Deutscher Kronprinz; General der Infanterie; Wilhelm, Crown Prince of Germany	1st Army; General der Infanterie; Otto von Below	VII Reserve Corps	50th Reserve Division
Heeresgruppe Deutscher Kronprinz; General der Infanterie; Wilhelm, Crown Prince of Germany	1st Army; General der Infanterie; Otto von Below	VII Reserve Corps	8th Bavarian Reserve Division
Heeresgruppe Deutscher Kronprinz; General der Infanterie; Wilhelm, Crown Prince of Germany	1st Army; General der Infanterie; Otto von Below	VII Reserve Corps	17th Division
Heeresgruppe Deutscher Kronprinz; General der Infanterie; Wilhelm, Crown Prince of Germany	1st Army; General der Infanterie; Otto von Below	VII Reserve Corps	parts of Guards Cavalry Schützen Division
Heeresgruppe Deutscher Kronprinz; General der Infanterie; Wilhelm, Crown Prince of Germany	1st Army; General der Infanterie; Otto von Below	VI Reserve Corps	80th Reserve Division
Heeresgruppe Deutscher Kronprinz; General der Infanterie; Wilhelm, Crown Prince of Germany	1st Army; General der Infanterie; Otto von Below	VI Reserve Corps	Guards Cavalry Schützen Division (less elements)
Heeresgruppe Deutscher Kronprinz; General der Infanterie; Wilhelm, Crown Prince of Germany	1st Army; General der Infanterie; Otto von Below	XXIV Reserve Corps	51st Reserve Division
Heeresgruppe Deutscher Kronprinz; General der Infanterie; Wilhelm, Crown Prince of Germany	1st Army; General der Infanterie; Otto von Below	XXIV Reserve Corps	7th Division
Heeresgruppe Deutscher Kronprinz; General der Infanterie; Wilhelm, Crown Prince of Germany	3rd Army; Generaloberst; Karl von Einem	XXV Reserve Corps	9th Landwehr Division
Heeresgruppe Deutscher Kronprinz; General der Infanterie; Wilhelm, Crown Prince of Germany	3rd Army; Generaloberst; Karl von Einem	XXV Reserve Corps	199th Division
Heeresgruppe Deutscher Kronprinz; General der Infanterie; Wilhelm, Crown Prince of Germany	3rd Army; Generaloberst; Karl von Einem	XXV Reserve Corps	3rd Guards Division
Heeresgruppe Deutscher Kronprinz; General der Infanterie; Wilhelm, Crown Prince of Germany	3rd Army; Generaloberst; Karl von Einem	XXV Reserve Corps	1st Guards Division
Heeresgruppe Deutscher Kronprinz; General der Infanterie; Wilhelm, Crown Prince of Germany	3rd Army; Generaloberst; Karl von Einem	XVI Corps	213th Division
Heeresgruppe Deutscher Kronprinz; General der Infanterie; Wilhelm, Crown Prince of Germany	3rd Army; Generaloberst; Karl von Einem	XVI Corps	242nd Division
Heeresgruppe Deutscher Kronprinz; General der Infanterie; Wilhelm, Crown Prince of Germany	3rd Army; Generaloberst; Karl von Einem	XVI Corps	1st Bavarian Division
Heeresgruppe Deutscher Kronprinz; General der Infanterie; Wilhelm, Crown Prince of Germany	3rd Army; Generaloberst; Karl von Einem	I Reserve Corps	202nd Division
Heeresgruppe Deutscher Kronprinz; General der Infanterie; Wilhelm, Crown Prince of Germany	3rd Army; Generaloberst; Karl von Einem	I Reserve Corps	14th Reserve Division
Heeresgruppe Deutscher Kronprinz; General der Infanterie; Wilhelm, Crown Prince of Germany	3rd Army; Generaloberst; Karl von Einem	I Reserve Corps	203rd Division
Heeresgruppe Deutscher Kronprinz; General der Infanterie; Wilhelm, Crown Prince of Germany	3rd Army; Generaloberst; Karl von Einem	I Reserve Corps	195th Division
Heeresgruppe Deutscher Kronprinz; General der Infanterie; Wilhelm, Crown Prince of Germany	3rd Army; Generaloberst; Karl von Einem	I Reserve Corps	76th Reserve Division
Heeresgruppe Deutscher Kronprinz; General der Infanterie; Wilhelm, Crown Prince of Germany	3rd Army; Generaloberst; Karl von Einem	I Reserve Corps	42nd Division
Heeresgruppe Deutscher Kronprinz; General der Infanterie; Wilhelm, Crown Prince of Germany	3rd Army; Generaloberst; Karl von Einem	I Reserve Corps	103rd Division
Heeresgruppe Deutscher Kronprinz; General der Infanterie; Wilhelm, Crown Prince of Germany	3rd Army; Generaloberst; Karl von Einem	XXXVIII Reserve Corps	No units assigned
Heeresgruppe Deutscher Kronprinz; General der Infanterie; Wilhelm, Crown Prince of Germany	3rd Army; Generaloberst; Karl von Einem	Moving to Bavaria	4th Bavarian Division

=== Heeresgruppe Gallwitz ===
Army Group	Army	Corps	Division
Heeresgruppe Gallwitz; General der Artillerie; Max von Gallwitz	5th Army; General der Kavallerie; Georg von der Marwitz	58th Corps (z.b.V.)	240th Division
Heeresgruppe Gallwitz; General der Artillerie; Max von Gallwitz	5th Army; General der Kavallerie; Georg von der Marwitz	58th Corps (z.b.V.)	15th Bavarian Division
Heeresgruppe Gallwitz; General der Artillerie; Max von Gallwitz	5th Army; General der Kavallerie; Georg von der Marwitz	58th Corps (z.b.V.)	52nd Division
Heeresgruppe Gallwitz; General der Artillerie; Max von Gallwitz	5th Army; General der Kavallerie; Georg von der Marwitz	58th Corps (z.b.V.)	31st Division
Heeresgruppe Gallwitz; General der Artillerie; Max von Gallwitz	5th Army; General der Kavallerie; Georg von der Marwitz	XXI Corps	13th Division
Heeresgruppe Gallwitz; General der Artillerie; Max von Gallwitz	5th Army; General der Kavallerie; Georg von der Marwitz	XXI Corps	28th Division
Heeresgruppe Gallwitz; General der Artillerie; Max von Gallwitz	5th Army; General der Kavallerie; Georg von der Marwitz	XXI Corps	107th Division
Heeresgruppe Gallwitz; General der Artillerie; Max von Gallwitz	5th Army; General der Kavallerie; Georg von der Marwitz	XXI Corps	5th Bavarian Reserve Division
Heeresgruppe Gallwitz; General der Artillerie; Max von Gallwitz	5th Army; General der Kavallerie; Georg von der Marwitz	XXI Corps	88th Division
Heeresgruppe Gallwitz; General der Artillerie; Max von Gallwitz	5th Army; General der Kavallerie; Georg von der Marwitz	XXI Corps	115th Division
Heeresgruppe Gallwitz; General der Artillerie; Max von Gallwitz	5th Army; General der Kavallerie; Georg von der Marwitz	V Reserve Corps	123rd Division
Heeresgruppe Gallwitz; General der Artillerie; Max von Gallwitz	5th Army; General der Kavallerie; Georg von der Marwitz	V Reserve Corps	1st Division (Austria-Hungary)
Heeresgruppe Gallwitz; General der Artillerie; Max von Gallwitz	5th Army; General der Kavallerie; Georg von der Marwitz	V Reserve Corps	part of 106th Division (Austria-Hungary)
Heeresgruppe Gallwitz; General der Artillerie; Max von Gallwitz	5th Army; General der Kavallerie; Georg von der Marwitz	V Reserve Corps	228th Division
Heeresgruppe Gallwitz; General der Artillerie; Max von Gallwitz	5th Army; General der Kavallerie; Georg von der Marwitz	V Reserve Corps	192nd Division
Heeresgruppe Gallwitz; General der Artillerie; Max von Gallwitz	5th Army; General der Kavallerie; Georg von der Marwitz	V Reserve Corps	41st Division
Heeresgruppe Gallwitz; General der Artillerie; Max von Gallwitz	5th Army; General der Kavallerie; Georg von der Marwitz	V Reserve Corps	27th Division
Heeresgruppe Gallwitz; General der Artillerie; Max von Gallwitz	5th Army; General der Kavallerie; Georg von der Marwitz	V Reserve Corps	117th Division
Heeresgruppe Gallwitz; General der Artillerie; Max von Gallwitz	5th Army; General der Kavallerie; Georg von der Marwitz	IX Reserve Corps	1st Landwehr Division
Heeresgruppe Gallwitz; General der Artillerie; Max von Gallwitz	5th Army; General der Kavallerie; Georg von der Marwitz	IX Reserve Corps	15th Division
Heeresgruppe Gallwitz; General der Artillerie; Max von Gallwitz	5th Army; General der Kavallerie; Georg von der Marwitz	XVIII Corps (Austria-Hungary)	33rd Division
Heeresgruppe Gallwitz; General der Artillerie; Max von Gallwitz	5th Army; General der Kavallerie; Georg von der Marwitz	XVIII Corps (Austria-Hungary)	32nd Division
Heeresgruppe Gallwitz; General der Artillerie; Max von Gallwitz	5th Army; General der Kavallerie; Georg von der Marwitz	XVIII Corps (Austria-Hungary)	106th Division (Austria-Hungary) (less elements)
Heeresgruppe Gallwitz; General der Artillerie; Max von Gallwitz	5th Army; General der Kavallerie; Georg von der Marwitz	XVIII Corps (Austria-Hungary)	37th Division
Heeresgruppe Gallwitz; General der Artillerie; Max von Gallwitz	5th Army; General der Kavallerie; Georg von der Marwitz	XVIII Corps (Austria-Hungary)	236th Division
Heeresgruppe Gallwitz; General der Artillerie; Max von Gallwitz	5th Army; General der Kavallerie; Georg von der Marwitz	XVIII Corps (Austria-Hungary)	20th Division
Heeresgruppe Gallwitz; General der Artillerie; Max von Gallwitz	5th Army; General der Kavallerie; Georg von der Marwitz	Moving to Armee-Abteilung C	45th Reserve Division
Heeresgruppe Gallwitz; General der Artillerie; Max von Gallwitz	Armee-Abteilung C Generalleutnant; Georg Fuchs	XIII Corps	5th Guards Division
Heeresgruppe Gallwitz; General der Artillerie; Max von Gallwitz	Armee-Abteilung C Generalleutnant; Georg Fuchs	XIII Corps	3rd Bavarian Division
Heeresgruppe Gallwitz; General der Artillerie; Max von Gallwitz	Armee-Abteilung C Generalleutnant; Georg Fuchs	XIII Corps	241st Division
Heeresgruppe Gallwitz; General der Artillerie; Max von Gallwitz	Armee-Abteilung C Generalleutnant; Georg Fuchs	V Corps	13th Landwehr Division
Heeresgruppe Gallwitz; General der Artillerie; Max von Gallwitz	Armee-Abteilung C Generalleutnant; Georg Fuchs	V Corps	94th Division
Heeresgruppe Gallwitz; General der Artillerie; Max von Gallwitz	Armee-Abteilung C Generalleutnant; Georg Fuchs	V Corps	35th Division (Austria-Hungary)
Heeresgruppe Gallwitz; General der Artillerie; Max von Gallwitz	Armee-Abteilung C Generalleutnant; Georg Fuchs	XII Reserve Corps	5th Landwehr Division
Heeresgruppe Gallwitz; General der Artillerie; Max von Gallwitz	Armee-Abteilung C Generalleutnant; Georg Fuchs	XII Reserve Corps	224th Division
Heeresgruppe Gallwitz; General der Artillerie; Max von Gallwitz	Armee-Abteilung C Generalleutnant; Georg Fuchs	57th Corps (z.b.V.)	8th Landwehr Division
Heeresgruppe Gallwitz; General der Artillerie; Max von Gallwitz	Armee-Abteilung C Generalleutnant; Georg Fuchs	57th Corps (z.b.V.)	255th Division
Heeresgruppe Gallwitz; General der Artillerie; Max von Gallwitz	Armee-Abteilung C Generalleutnant; Georg Fuchs	Group Metz	31st Landwehr Brigade
Heeresgruppe Gallwitz; General der Artillerie; Max von Gallwitz	Armee-Abteilung C Generalleutnant; Georg Fuchs	Group Metz	10th Division
Heeresgruppe Gallwitz; General der Artillerie; Max von Gallwitz	Armee-Abteilung C Generalleutnant; Georg Fuchs	Group Metz	18th Landwehr Division
Heeresgruppe Gallwitz; General der Artillerie; Max von Gallwitz	Armee-Abteilung C Generalleutnant; Georg Fuchs	Group Metz	2nd Landwehr Division

=== Heeresgruppe Herzog Albrecht von Württemberg ===
Army Group	Army	Corps	Division
Heeresgruppe Herzog Albrecht von Württemberg; Generalfeldmarschall; Albrecht, Duke of Württemberg	19th Army; Generaloberst; Felix Graf von Bothmer	XIX Corps	84th Landwehr Brigade
Heeresgruppe Herzog Albrecht von Württemberg; Generalfeldmarschall; Albrecht, Duke of Württemberg	19th Army; Generaloberst; Felix Graf von Bothmer	XIX Corps	48th Landwehr Division
Heeresgruppe Herzog Albrecht von Württemberg; Generalfeldmarschall; Albrecht, Duke of Württemberg	19th Army; Generaloberst; Felix Graf von Bothmer	66th Corps (z.b.V.)	2nd Bavarian Landwehr Division
Heeresgruppe Herzog Albrecht von Württemberg; Generalfeldmarschall; Albrecht, Duke of Württemberg	19th Army; Generaloberst; Felix Graf von Bothmer	66th Corps (z.b.V.)	19th Ersatz Division
Heeresgruppe Herzog Albrecht von Württemberg; Generalfeldmarschall; Albrecht, Duke of Württemberg	19th Army; Generaloberst; Felix Graf von Bothmer	66th Corps (z.b.V.)	17th Reserve Division
Heeresgruppe Herzog Albrecht von Württemberg; Generalfeldmarschall; Albrecht, Duke of Württemberg	19th Army; Generaloberst; Felix Graf von Bothmer	XV Corps	1st Bavarian Landwehr Division
Heeresgruppe Herzog Albrecht von Württemberg; Generalfeldmarschall; Albrecht, Duke of Württemberg	19th Army; Generaloberst; Felix Graf von Bothmer	XV Corps	83rd Division
Heeresgruppe Herzog Albrecht von Württemberg; Generalfeldmarschall; Albrecht, Duke of Württemberg	Armee-Abteilung A General der Infanterie; Johannes von Eben	59th Corps (z.b.V.)	96th Division
Heeresgruppe Herzog Albrecht von Württemberg; Generalfeldmarschall; Albrecht, Duke of Württemberg	Armee-Abteilung A General der Infanterie; Johannes von Eben	59th Corps (z.b.V.)	21st Landwehr Division
Heeresgruppe Herzog Albrecht von Württemberg; Generalfeldmarschall; Albrecht, Duke of Württemberg	Armee-Abteilung A General der Infanterie; Johannes von Eben	59th Corps (z.b.V.)	75th Reserve Division
Heeresgruppe Herzog Albrecht von Württemberg; Generalfeldmarschall; Albrecht, Duke of Württemberg	Armee-Abteilung A General der Infanterie; Johannes von Eben	VII Corps	82nd Composite Reserve Infantry Brigade
Heeresgruppe Herzog Albrecht von Württemberg; Generalfeldmarschall; Albrecht, Duke of Württemberg	Armee-Abteilung A General der Infanterie; Johannes von Eben	VII Corps	301st Division
Heeresgruppe Herzog Albrecht von Württemberg; Generalfeldmarschall; Albrecht, Duke of Württemberg	Armee-Abteilung A General der Infanterie; Johannes von Eben	XV Bavarian Reserve Corps	39th Bavarian Reserve Division
Heeresgruppe Herzog Albrecht von Württemberg; Generalfeldmarschall; Albrecht, Duke of Württemberg	Armee-Abteilung A General der Infanterie; Johannes von Eben	XV Bavarian Reserve Corps	61st Landwehr Brigade
Heeresgruppe Herzog Albrecht von Württemberg; Generalfeldmarschall; Albrecht, Duke of Württemberg	Armee-Abteilung A General der Infanterie; Johannes von Eben	IX Corps (Austria-Hungary)	37th Division (Austria-Hungary)
Heeresgruppe Herzog Albrecht von Württemberg; Generalfeldmarschall; Albrecht, Duke of Württemberg	Armee-Abteilung A General der Infanterie; Johannes von Eben	IX Corps (Austria-Hungary)	4th Landwehr Division
Heeresgruppe Herzog Albrecht von Württemberg; Generalfeldmarschall; Albrecht, Duke of Württemberg	Armee-Abteilung B General der Infanterie; Erich von Gündell	64th Corps (z.b.V.)	6th Bavarian Landwehr Division
Heeresgruppe Herzog Albrecht von Württemberg; Generalfeldmarschall; Albrecht, Duke of Württemberg	Armee-Abteilung B General der Infanterie; Erich von Gündell	64th Corps (z.b.V.)	4th Cavalry Schützen Division
Heeresgruppe Herzog Albrecht von Württemberg; Generalfeldmarschall; Albrecht, Duke of Württemberg	Armee-Abteilung B General der Infanterie; Erich von Gündell	64th Corps (z.b.V.)	7th Cavalry Schützen Division
Heeresgruppe Herzog Albrecht von Württemberg; Generalfeldmarschall; Albrecht, Duke of Württemberg	Armee-Abteilung B General der Infanterie; Erich von Gündell	X Corps	26th Landwehr Division
Heeresgruppe Herzog Albrecht von Württemberg; Generalfeldmarschall; Albrecht, Duke of Württemberg	Armee-Abteilung B General der Infanterie; Erich von Gündell	X Corps	30th Bavarian Reserve Division
Heeresgruppe Herzog Albrecht von Württemberg; Generalfeldmarschall; Albrecht, Duke of Württemberg	Armee-Abteilung B General der Infanterie; Erich von Gündell	X Corps	31st Division
Heeresgruppe Herzog Albrecht von Württemberg; Generalfeldmarschall; Albrecht, Duke of Württemberg	Armee-Abteilung B General der Infanterie; Erich von Gündell	XII Corps	44th Landwehr Division
Heeresgruppe Herzog Albrecht von Württemberg; Generalfeldmarschall; Albrecht, Duke of Württemberg	Armee-Abteilung B General der Infanterie; Erich von Gündell	XII Corps	25th Landwehr Division

== Glossary ==
- Armee-Abteilung or Army Detachment in the sense of "something detached from an Army". It is not under the command of an Army so is in itself a small Army.
- Armee-Gruppe or Army Group in the sense of a group within an Army and under its command, generally formed as a temporary measure for a specific task.
- Heeresgruppe or Army Group in the sense of a number of armies under a single commander.

== See also ==
- German Army order of battle (1914)
- German Army order of battle (Spring Offensive)

== Bibliography ==
- Cron, Hermann (2002). Imperial German Army 1914–18: Organisation, Structure, Orders-of-Battle [first published: 1937]. Helion & Co. ISBN 1-874622-70-1.
- Ellis, John; Cox, Michael (1993). The World War I Databook. Aurum Press Ltd. ISBN 1-85410-766-6.
