= Spring Offensive order of battle =

German Spring Offensive, 1918
- Part of the Western Front of World War I
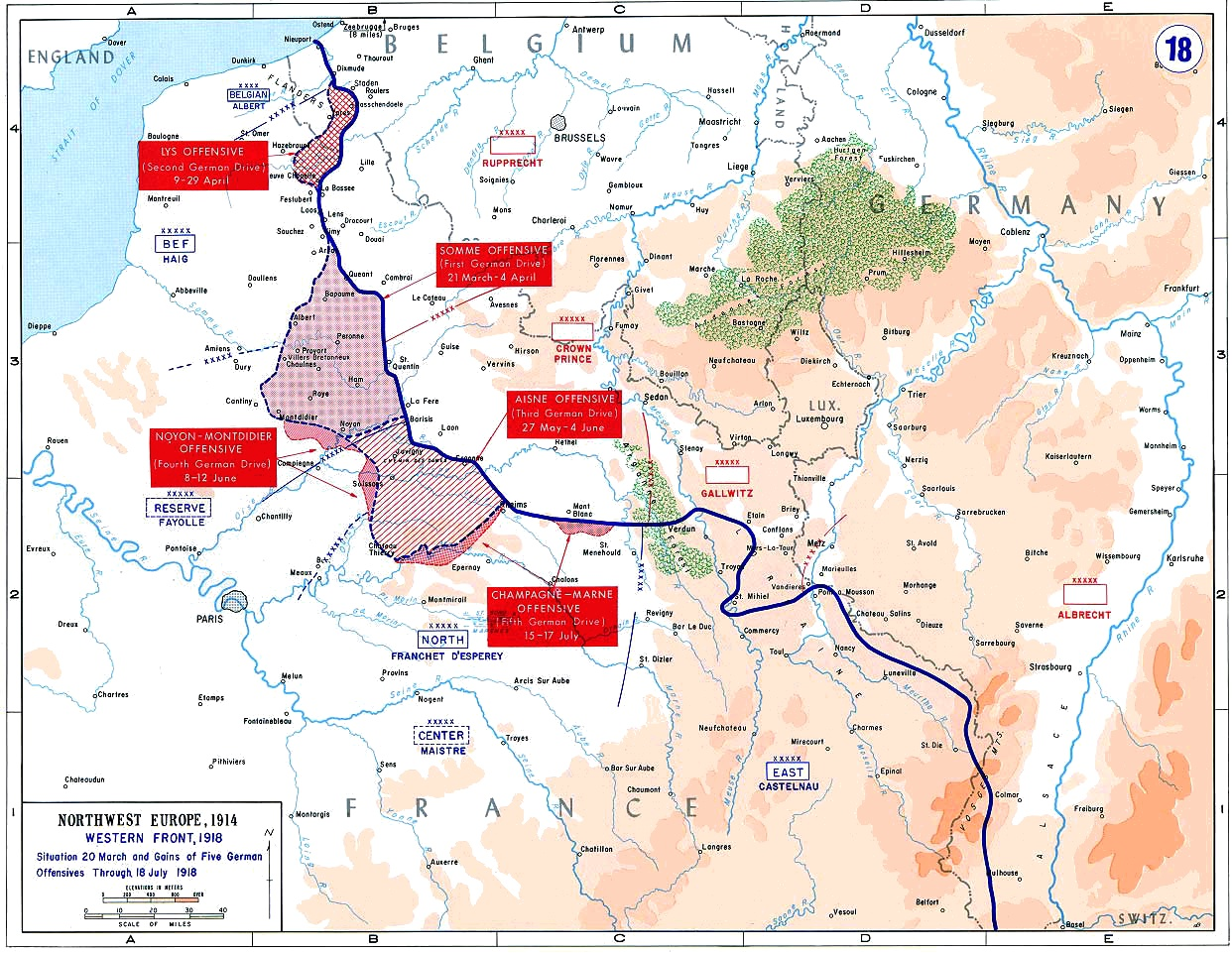
- German gains in 1918
Date	21 March – 18 July 1918
Location	Northern France; West Flanders, Belgium 50°00′10″N 02°39′10″E
Result	See Aftermath section

Belligerents
German Empire: (Kingdom of Bavaria) Bavaria; Prussia; Saxony; Württemberg	(French Third Republic) France; British Empire: Australia; Canada; India; (Dominion of Newfoundland) Newfoundland; (Dominion of New Zealand) New Zealand; South Africa; (United Kingdom of Great Britain and Ireland) United Kingdom; United States (Kingdom of Italy) Italy; Portugal

Commanders and leaders
(German Empire) Erich Ludendorff	(French Third Republic) Ferdinand Foch (United Kingdom of Great Britain and Ireland) Douglas Haig (French Third Republic) Philippe Pétain (United States) John J. Pershing (Kingdom of Italy) Alberico Albricci (Portugal) Tamagnini de Abreu

This is the order of battle for Operation Michael, part of the German Spring Offensive fought from 21 March to 5 April 1918 as one of the main engagements of the First World War. It was fought between mixed French, British and Dominion forces and the German Empire in the Somme region in northern France.

== German forces, Western Front ==
=== Army Group Crown Prince Rupprecht ===
- Generalfeldmarschall Rupprecht, Crown Prince of Bavaria
  - Chief of Staff: General Hermann von Kuhl
- 4th Army (18 divisions)
  - General der Infanterie Friedrich Sixt von Armin
  - Chief of Staff: General Fritz von Loßberg
- 6th Army (15 divisions)
  - General der Infanterie Ferdinand von Quast
  - Chief of Staff: Lieutenant-Colonel Hermann Baron von Lenz
- 17th Army (28 divisions) *
  - General der Infanterie Otto von Below
  - Chief of Staff: General Konrad Krafft von Dellmensingen
- 2nd Army (21 divisions)
  - General der Kavallerie Georg von der Marwitz
  - Chief of Staff: Colonel Erich von Tschischwitz

=== Army Group German Crown Prince ===
- General der Infanterie Wilhelm, Crown Prince of Germany
  - Chief of Staff: Colonel Friedrich Bernhard Count von der Schulenburg
- 18th Army (27 divisions)
  - General der Infanterie Oskar von Hutier
  - Chief of Staff: General Traugott von Sauberzweig
- 7th Army (11 divisions)
  - Generaloberst Max von Boehn
  - Chief of Staff: Lieutenant-Colonel Walther Reinhardt
- 1st Army (12 divisions)
  - General der Infanterie Fritz von Below
  - Chief of Staff: Lieutenant-Colonel Robert von Klüber
- 3rd Army (11 divisions)
  - Generaloberst Karl von Einem
  - Chief of Staff: Lieutenant-Colonel Wilhelm von Klewitz

=== Army Group Gallwitz ===
- General der Artillerie Max von Gallwitz
  - Chief of Staff: Lieutenant-Colonel Richard von Pawelsz
- 5th Army (12 divisions)
  - General der Artillerie Max von Gallwitz
  - Chief of Staff: Lieutenant-Colonel von Pawelsz
- Armee-Abteilung C (12 divisions)
  - Generalleutnant Georg Fuchs
  - Chief of Staff: Colonel Otto Baron von Ledebur

=== Army Group Duke Albrecht ===
- Generalfeldmarschall Albrecht, Duke of Württemberg
  - Chief of Staff: Colonel Wilhelm Heye
- 19th Army (10.5 divisions)
  - General der Infanterie Felix Graf von Bothmer
  - Chief of Staff: Colonel Hans Ritter von Hemmer
- Armee-Abteilung A (5 infantry, 2 dismounted cavalry divisions)
  - General der Infanterie Bruno von Mudra
  - Chief of Staff: Lieutenant-Colonel Friedrich Baron von Esebeck
- Armee-Abteilung B (9 infantry, 1 dismounted cavalry division)
  - General der Infanterie Erich von Gündell
  - Chief of Staff: Lieutenant-Colonel Hermann Drechsel

== British armies ==
=== Fifth Army ===
General Sir Hubert Gough

- III Corps (Lieutenant-General Sir R. H. K. Butler)
  - 58th (2/1st London) Division
  - 18th (Eastern) Division
  - 14th (Light) Division
- XVIII Corps (Lieutenant-General Sir I. Maxse)
  - 36th (Ulster) Division
  - 30th Division
  - 61st (2nd South Midland) Division
  - 20th (Light) Division (from 21 March)
- XIX Corps (Lieutenant-General Sir H. E. Watts)
  - 24th Division
  - 66th (2nd East Lancashire) Division
  - 50th (Northumbrian) Division (from 21 March)
  - 8th Division (from 22 March)
- VII Corps (Lieutenant-General Sir W. N. Congreve VC)
  - 16th (Irish) Division
  - 21st Division
  - 9th (Scottish) Division
  - 39th Division
  - 35th Division (from 23 March)
  - 12th (Eastern) Division (from 25 March)

US Army

- 6th Battalion United States (railway) Engineers (2 companies)

=== Third Army ===
General Hon. Sir Julian Byng

- V Corps (Lieutenant-General Sir E. A. Fanshawe)
  - 47th (1/2nd London) Division
  - 63rd (Royal Naval) Division
  - 17th (Northern) Division
  - 2nd Division
  - 19th (Western) Division
  - 12th (Eastern) Division (from 8:30 p.m. on 25 March)
- IV Corps (Lieutenant-General Sir G. M. Harper)
  - 51st (Highland) Division
  - 6th Division
  - 25th Division
  - 19th (Western) Division (from 21 March)
  - 41st Division (from 22 March)
  - 42nd (East Lancashire) Division (from 24 March)
  - 62nd (2nd West Riding) Division (from 25 March)
  - New Zealand Division (from 25/26 March)
  - 4th Australian Division (from 25/26 March)
- VI Corps (Lieutenant-General Sir J. A. L. Haldane)
  - 59th (2nd North Midland) Division
  - 34th Division
  - 3rd Division
  - 40th Division (from 21 March)
  - Guards Division (from 22 March)
  - 31st Division (from 22 March)
- XVII Corps Corps (Lieutenant-General Sir Charles Fergusson, Bt.)
  - 15th (Scottish) Division
  - 4th Division
  - Guards Division
- Cavalry Corps (Lieutenant-General Sir C. T. MacM. Kavanagh)
  - 1st Cavalry Division
  - 2nd Cavalry Division
  - 3rd Cavalry Division

== French Group of Armies of Reserve ==
General Émile Fayolle

=== Third Army ===
General Georges Louis Humbert

- V Corps (General Maurice Pellé)
  - 125th Division (from 22 March)
  - 1st Dismounted Cavalry Division (from 23 March)
  - 9th Division (from 23 March)
  - 10th Division (from 23 March)
  - 55th Division (from 24 March)
  - 1st Division (from 25 March)
  - 35th Division (from 25 March)
  - 53rd Division (part, from 26 March)
  - 77th Division (part, from 26 March)
- II Cavalry Corps (General Félix Adolphe Robillot) (Note: Staff only)
  - 22nd Division (from 24 March)
  - 62nd Division (from 24 March)

=== First Army ===
General Marie-Eugène Debeney

- 56th Division (from 25 March)
- II Cavalry Corps (Note: Divisions were deployed separately)
- 1st Cavalry Division (from 26 March)
- 5th Cavalry Division (from 26 March)
- 6th Cavalry Division (from 27 March)

== Bibliography ==
- Edmonds, J. E.; et al. (1995) [1935]. Military Operations France and Belgium, 1918 The German March Offensive and its Preliminaries. History of the Great War Based on Official Documents By Direction of the Historical Section of the Committee of Imperial Defence (Imperial War Museum & Battery Press ed.). London: HMSO. ISBN 0-89839-219-5.
- Kitchen, Martin (2001). The German Offensives of 1918. Stroud: Tempus. ISBN 0752417991.
