= 19th Army (German Empire) =

19. Armee; 19th Army
- Flag of the Staff of an Armee Oberkommando (1871–1918)
- Active: 4 February 1918 – 24 January 1919
- Country: German Empire
- Branch: German Army
- Type: Field army
- Engagements: World War I Spring Offensive

Insignia
- Abbreviation: A.O.K. 19

The 19th Army (German: 19. Armee / Armeeoberkommando 19 / A.O.K. 19) was an army level command of the German Army in World War I. It was formed in France on 4 February 1918 from the former South Army command. It served exclusively on the Western Front and was dissolved on 24 January 1919.

== History ==
19th Army was one of three armies (along with 17th Army and 18th Army) formed in late 1917 / early 1918 with forces withdrawn from the Eastern Front. They were in place to take part in Ludendorff's German spring offensive. The Germans had realised that their only remaining chance of victory was to defeat the Allies before the overwhelming human and matériel resources of the United States could be deployed. They also had the temporary advantage in numbers afforded by nearly 50 divisions freed by the Russian withdrawal from the war (Treaty of Brest-Litovsk). It was still in existence when the war ended, serving on the Western Front as part of Heeresgruppe Herzog Albrecht von Württemberg.

=== Order of Battle, 30 October 1918 ===
By the end of World War I, the majority of the units assigned were lower quality Landwehr Divisions indicative of the relatively quiet sector that the Army was operating in.

Organization of 19th Army on 30 October 1918
Army	Corps	Division
19th Army	XIX Corps	84th Landwehr Brigade
19th Army	XIX Corps	48th Landwehr Division
19th Army	66th Corps (z.b.V.)	2nd Bavarian Landwehr Division
19th Army	66th Corps (z.b.V.)	19th Ersatz Division
19th Army	66th Corps (z.b.V.)	17th Reserve Division
19th Army	XV Corps	1st Bavarian Landwehr Division
19th Army	XV Corps	83rd Division

== Commanders ==
19th Army had the following commanders:

19th Army
From	Commander	Previously	Subsequently,
4 February 1918	General der Infanterie Felix Graf von Bothmer	South Army	Adviser to the Bavarian Ministry for Military Affairs
9 April 1918	Generaloberst Felix Graf von Bothmer	South Army	Adviser to the Bavarian Ministry for Military Affairs
8 November 1918	General der Infanterie Karl von Fasbender	I Bavarian Reserve Corps	Active reserve status

== Glossary ==
- Armee-Abteilung or Army Detachment in the sense of "something detached from an Army". It is not under the command of an Army so is in itself a small Army.
- Armee-Gruppe or Army Group in the sense of a group within an Army and under its command, generally formed as a temporary measure for a specific task.
- Heeresgruppe or Army Group in the sense of a number of armies under a single commander.

== See also ==
- 19th Army (Wehrmacht) for the equivalent formation in World War II
- German Army order of battle, Western Front (1918)

== Bibliography ==
- Cron, Hermann (2002). Imperial German Army 1914–18: Organisation, Structure, Orders-of-Battle [first published: 1937]. Helion & Co. ISBN 1-874622-70-1.
- Ellis, John; Cox, Michael (1993). The World War I Databook. Aurum Press Ltd. ISBN 1-85410-766-6.
