= 66th Corps (German Empire) =

Corps formation of the German Army in World War I

66th Corps (Generalkommando zbV 66)
- Flag of the Staff of a Generalkommando (1871–1918)
- Active: 9 May 1917-1919
- Disbanded: 1919
- Country: German Empire
- Branch: Army
- Engagements: World War I

Insignia
- Abbreviation: Genkdo zbV 66

The 66th Corps (German: Generalkommando zbV 66) was a corps formation of the German Army in World War I. It was formed on 9 May 1917 and was still in existence at the end of the war.

== Chronicle ==
The 66th Corps (z.b.V.) was formed on 9 May 1917. It was formerly known as Gruppe "Nowogrodek", named for the city of Nowogrodek. (Now known as Navahrudak.)

With the onset of trench warfare, the German Army recognised that it was no longer possible to maintain the traditional Corps unit, that is, one made up of two divisions. Whereas at some times (and in some places) a Corps of two divisions was sufficient, at other times 5 or 6 divisions were necessary. Therefore, under the Hindenburg regime (from summer 1916), new Corps headquarters were created without organic divisions. These new Corps were designated General Commands for Special Use (German: Generalkommandos zur besonderen Verwendung).

By the end of the war, the Corps was serving on the Western Front as part of 19th Army, Heeresgruppe Herzog Albrecht von Württemberg with the following composition:

- 2nd Bavarian Landwehr Division
- 19th Ersatz Division
- 17th Reserve Division

== Commanders ==
The 66th Corps had the following commanders during its existence:

Commander	From	To
General der Infanterie Ludwig von Held	15 April 1917	3 February 1918
Generalleutnant Adolf von der Esch	3 February 1918	22 September 1918
Generalleutnant Walter von Bergmann	22 September 1918	end of the war

== Glossary ==
- Armee-Abteilung or Army Detachment in the sense of "something detached from an Army". It is not under the command of an Army so is in itself a small Army.
- Armee-Gruppe or Army Group in the sense of a group within an Army and under its command, generally formed as a temporary measure for a specific task.
- Heeresgruppe or Army Group in the sense of a number of armies under a single commander.

== See also ==
- German Army (German Empire)
- German Army order of battle, Western Front (1918)

== Bibliography ==
- Cron, Hermann (2002). Imperial German Army 1914-18: Organisation, Structure, Orders-of-Battle [first published: 1937]. Helion & Co. ISBN 1-874622-70-1.
- Ellis, John; Cox, Michael (1993). The World War I Databook. Aurum Press Ltd. ISBN 1-85410-766-6.
