= 18th Army (German Empire) =

18. Armee; 18th Army
- Flag of the Staff of an Armee Oberkommando (1871–1918)
- Active: 22 December 1917 – 2 January 1919
- Country: German Empire
- Type: Army
- Engagements: World War I Spring Offensive: Operation Michael

Insignia
- Abbreviation: A.O.K. 18

The 18th Army (German: 18. Armee / Armeeoberkommando 18 / A.O.K. 18) was an army level command of the German Army in World War I. It was formed against France on 27 December 1917 from the former Heeresgruppe Woyrsch command. It served exclusively on the Western Front and was dissolved on 2 January 1919.

== History ==
18th Army was one of three armies (along with 17th Army and 19th Army) formed in late 1917 / early 1918 with forces withdrawn from the Eastern Front. They were in place to take part in Ludendorff's German spring offensive. The Germans had realised that their only remaining chance of victory was to defeat the Allies before the overwhelming human and matériel resources of the United States could be deployed. They also had the temporary advantage in numbers afforded by nearly 50 divisions freed by the Russian withdrawal from the war (Treaty of Brest-Litovsk).

At the end of the war it was serving as part of Heeresgruppe Deutscher Kronprinz.

=== Order of Battle, 30 October 1918 ===
By the end of the war, the 18th Army was organised as:

Organization of 18th Army on 30 October 1918
| Army | Corps | Division |
|---|---|---|
| 18th Army | I Bavarian Corps | 19th Reserve Division |
| 18th Army | I Bavarian Corps | 29th Division |
| 18th Army | I Bavarian Corps | 15th Reserve Division |
| 18th Army | I Bavarian Corps | 200th Division |
| 18th Army | I Bavarian Corps | 204th Division |
| 18th Army | I Bavarian Corps | 34th Division |
| 18th Army | XXVI Reserve Corps | 75th Reserve Division |
| 18th Army | XXVI Reserve Corps | 9th Division |
| 18th Army | XXVI Reserve Corps | 18th Division |
| 18th Army | XXVI Reserve Corps | 6th Bavarian Division |
| 18th Army | XVIII Reserve Corps | 231st Division |
| 18th Army | XVIII Reserve Corps | 238th Division |
| 18th Army | XVIII Reserve Corps | 81st Reserve Division |
| 18th Army | XVIII Reserve Corps | 2nd Division |
| 18th Army | XVIII Reserve Corps | 1st Reserve Division |
| 18th Army | XVIII Reserve Corps | two thirds of 82nd Reserve Division |
| 18th Army | XVIII Reserve Corps | 5th Reserve Division |
| 18th Army | XIV Corps | 232nd Division |
| 18th Army | XIV Corps | 237th Division |
| 18th Army | XIV Corps | 11th Division |
| 18th Army | XIV Corps | 221st Division |
| 18th Army | XIV Corps | 105th Division |
| 18th Army | XIV Corps | 87th Division |

== Commanders ==
18th Army was commanded throughout its existence by General der Infanterie Oskar von Hutier (previously commander of 8th Army).

== Glossary ==
- Armee-Abteilung or Army Detachment in the sense of "something detached from an Army". It is not under the command of an Army so is in itself a small Army.
- Armee-Gruppe or Army Group in the sense of a group within an Army and under its command, generally formed as a temporary measure for a specific task.
- Heeresgruppe or Army Group in the sense of a number of armies under a single commander.

== See also ==
- 18th Army (Wehrmacht) for the equivalent formation in World War II
- German Army order of battle, Western Front (1918)

== Bibliography ==
- Cron, Hermann (2002). Imperial German Army 1914–18: Organisation, Structure, Orders-of-Battle [first published: 1937]. Helion & Co. ISBN 1-874622-70-1.
- Ellis, John; Cox, Michael (1993). The World War I Databook. Aurum Press Ltd. ISBN 1-85410-766-6.
