= General Balck =

General Balck may refer to:

- Hermann Balck (1893–1982), German Wehrmacht general
- Viktor Balck (1844–1928), Swedish Army major general
- William Balck (1858–1924) Imperial German Army lieutenant general
