= 55th Corps (German Empire) =

55th Corps (Generalkommando zbV 55)
- Flag of the Staff of a Generalkommando (1871–1918)
- Active: June 1916-1919
- Disbanded: 1919
- Country: German Empire
- Branch: Army
- Engagements: World War I

Insignia
- Abbreviation: Genkdo zbV 55

The 55th Corps (German: Generalkommando zbV 55) was a corps formation of the German Army in World War I. It was formed as a temporary Bernhardi Corps (named for its commander) on 6 June 1916 before being established on 1 October 1916. It was still in existence at the end of the war.

== Chronicle ==
The 55th Corps (z.b.V.) was formed as a temporary Bernhardi Corps on 6 June 1916, named for its commander General der Kavallerie Friedrich von Bernhardi. On 1 October 1916, Bernhardi Corps was established as 55th Corps.

With the onset of trench warfare, the German Army recognised that it was no longer possible to maintain the traditional Corps unit, that is, one made up of two divisions. Whereas at some times (and in some places) a Corps of two divisions was sufficient, at other times 5 or 6 divisions were necessary. Therefore, under the Hindenburg regime (from summer 1916), new Corps headquarters were created without organic divisions. These new Corps were designated General Commands for Special Use (German: Generalkommandos zur besonderen Verwendung).

Bernhardi Corps was formed hastily in the summer of 1916 on the Austro-Hungarian front in the Volhynia region as a multi-national force defending against the Brusilov Offensive. German and Austrian troops were able to fend off the Russians in the area of the Styr and Stochid rivers. After two years on the Eastern Front, the Corps was transferred to the Western Front in February 1918 where was engaged at Armentières.

By the end of the war, the Corps still serving on the Western Front as part of 6th Army, Heeresgruppe Kronprinz Rupprecht with the following composition:

- 38th Division
- 12th Bavarian Division
- 5th Bavarian Division
- two thirds 4th Ersatz Division
- 9th Reserve Division

== Commanders ==
The 55th Corps was commanded by General der Kavallerie Friedrich von Bernhardi throughout its existence.

== See also ==
- German Army (German Empire)
- German Army order of battle, Western Front (1918)

== Bibliography ==
- Cron, Hermann (2002). Imperial German Army 1914-18: Organisation, Structure, Orders-of-Battle [first published: 1937]. Helion & Co. ISBN 1-874622-70-1.
- Ellis, John; Cox, Michael (1993). The World War I Databook. Aurum Press Ltd. ISBN 1-85410-766-6.
