= Von Below =

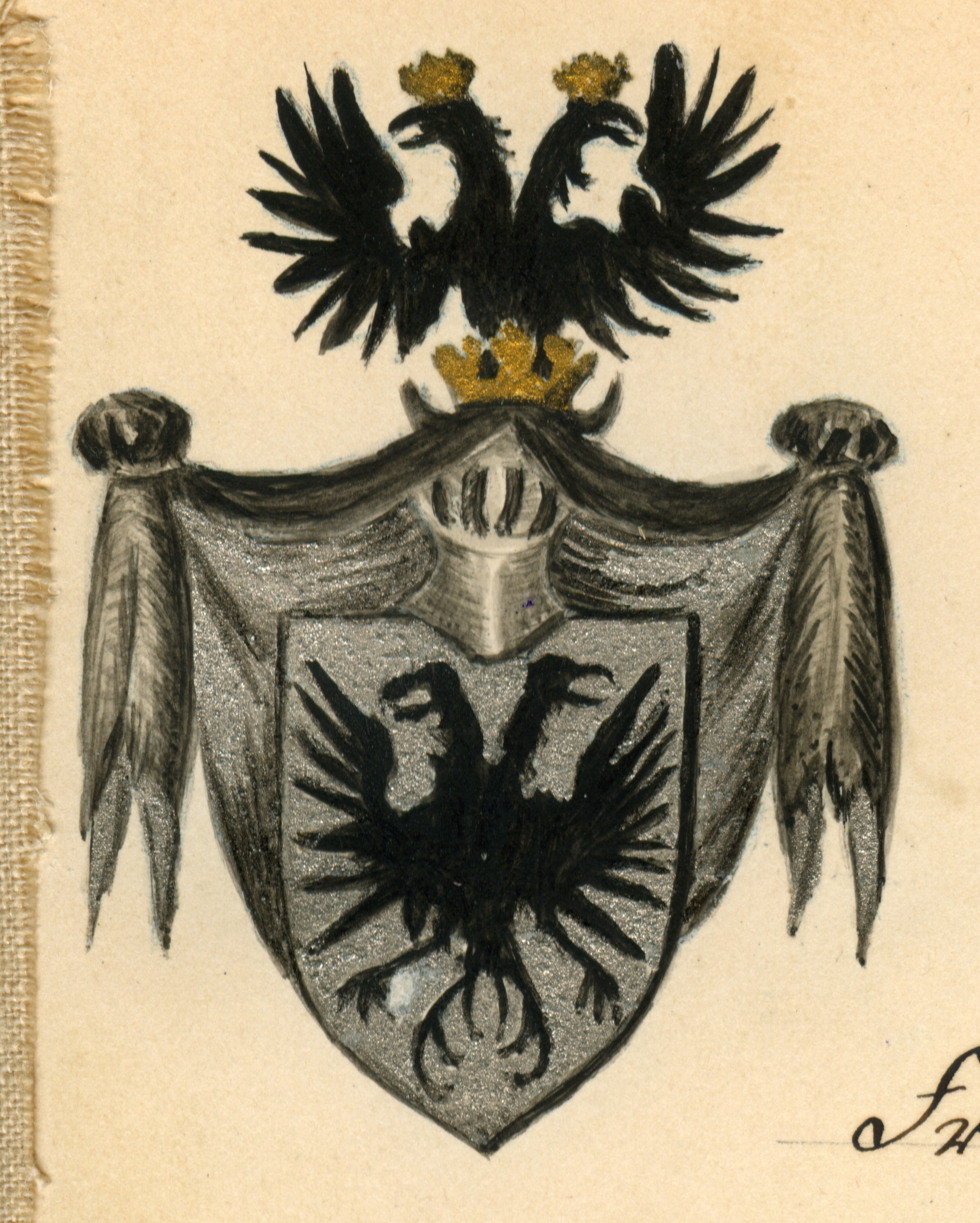
Coat of arms of the Below family

The von Below is the name of an ancient German noble family originated from Ratzeburg, Mecklenburg, first mentioned in 1194.

== Notable members ==
- Alexander von Below (1801–1882), landowner, member of the Reichstag and member of the Prussian House of Lords
- Anton von Below (1808–1896), Prussian lieutenant general
- Claus von Below-Saleske (1866–1939), German diplomat
- Eduard von Below (1856–1942), World War I general
- Ernst von Below (1863–1955), World War I general
- Fritz von Below (1853–1918), World War I general
- Georg von Below (1858–1927), German constitutional and economic historian
- Gerd von Below (1838-1892), Prussian lieutenant general
- Gerd-Paul von Below (1892–1953), World War II general
- Gerda von Below (1894–1975), German writer
- Gustav von Below (1791–1852), Prussian lieutenant general
- Gustav von Below (1790–1843), Pomeranian squire and pietist, founder of Below movement
- Hans von Below (1862–1933), World War I general
- Nicolaus von Below (1907–1983), adjutant of Adolf Hitler
- Nikolaus von Below (1837–1919), German politician
- Otto von Below (1857–1944), World War I general
- Richard von Below (1879–1925), German artist and illustrator
