= I Reserve Corps =

Unit of the Imperial German Army during World War I

I Reserve Corps I. Reserve-Korps
- Flag of the Staff of a Generalkommando (1871–1918)
- Active: 2 August 1914 - post November 1918
- Country: German Empire
- Type: Corps
- Size: Approximately 38,000 (on formation)
- Engagements: World War I Eastern Front Gumbinnen Tannenberg 1st Masurian Lakes

Insignia
- Abbreviation: I RK

The I Reserve Corps (German: I. Reserve-Korps / I RK) was a corps level command of the German Army in World War I.

== Formation ==
I Reserve Corps was formed on the outbreak of the war in August 1914 as part of the mobilisation of the Army. It was initially commanded by Generalleutnant Otto von Below. It was still in existence at the end of the war in the 3rd Army, Heeresgruppe Deutscher Kronprinz on the Western Front.

=== Structure on formation ===
On formation in August 1914, I Reserve Corps consisted of two divisions, made up of reserve units. In general, Reserve Corps and Reserve Divisions were weaker than their active counterparts

Reserve Infantry Regiments did not always have three battalions nor necessarily contain a machine gun company
Reserve Jäger Battalions did not have a machine gun company on formation
Reserve Cavalry Regiments consisted of just three squadrons
Reserve Field Artillery Regiments usually consisted of two abteilungen of three batteries each
Corps Troops generally consisted of a Telephone Detachment and four sections of munition columns and trains

In summary, I Reserve Corps mobilised with 26 infantry battalions, 11 machine gun companies (66 machine guns), 6 cavalry squadrons, 12 field artillery batteries (72 guns) and 2 pioneer companies. 1st Reserve Division was particularly strong in machine gun formations as the 1st, 3rd and 18th Reserve Infantry Regiments all had two machine gun companies. 36th Reserve Division was formed by units drawn from the XVII Corps District. It included one active Infantry Regiment (54th).

Corps	Division	Brigade	Units
I Reserve Corps	1st Reserve Division	1st Reserve Infantry Brigade	1st Reserve Infantry Regiment
I Reserve Corps	1st Reserve Division	1st Reserve Infantry Brigade	3rd Reserve Infantry Regiment
I Reserve Corps	1st Reserve Division	42nd Reserve Infantry Brigade	18th Reserve Infantry Regiment
I Reserve Corps	1st Reserve Division	42nd Reserve Infantry Brigade	59th Reserve Infantry Regiment
I Reserve Corps	1st Reserve Division	42nd Reserve Infantry Brigade	1st Reserve Jäger Battalion
I Reserve Corps	1st Reserve Division		1st Reserve Uhlan Regiment
I Reserve Corps	1st Reserve Division		1st Reserve Field Artillery Regiment
I Reserve Corps	1st Reserve Division		4th Company, 2nd Pioneer Battalion
I Reserve Corps	1st Reserve Division		1st Reserve Divisional Pontoon Train
I Reserve Corps	1st Reserve Division		1st Reserve Medical Company
I Reserve Corps	36th Reserve Division	69th Reserve Infantry Brigade	21st Reserve Infantry Regiment
I Reserve Corps	36th Reserve Division	69th Reserve Infantry Brigade	61st Reserve Infantry Regiment
I Reserve Corps	36th Reserve Division	69th Reserve Infantry Brigade	2nd Reserve Jäger Battalion
I Reserve Corps	36th Reserve Division	70th Reserve Infantry Brigade	54th Infantry Regiment
I Reserve Corps	36th Reserve Division	70th Reserve Infantry Brigade	5th Reserve Infantry Regiment
I Reserve Corps	36th Reserve Division		1st Reserve Hussar Regiment
I Reserve Corps	36th Reserve Division		36th Reserve Field Artillery Regiment
I Reserve Corps	36th Reserve Division		1st Reserve Company, 2nd Pioneer Battalion
I Reserve Corps	36th Reserve Division		36th Reserve Divisional Pontoon Train
I Reserve Corps	36th Reserve Division		15th Reserve Medical Company
I Reserve Corps	Corps Troops		1st Reserve Telephone Detachment
I Reserve Corps	Corps Troops		Munition Trains and Columns corresponding to the III Reserve Corps

== Combat chronicle ==
On mobilisation, I Reserve Corps was assigned to the 8th Army on the Eastern Front, intended to defend East Prussia while the rest of the German Army executed the Schlieffen Plan offensive against France.

== Commanders ==
I Reserve Corps had the following commanders during its existence:

From	Rank	Name
2 August 1914	Generalleutnant	Otto von Below
30 August 1914	General der Infanterie	Otto von Below
28 November 1914	Generalleutnant	Kurt von Morgen
24 August 1918	Generalleutnant	Richard Wellmann

== See also ==
- German Army order of battle (1914)
- German Army order of battle, Western Front (1918)
- Order of battle at Tannenberg

== Bibliography ==
- Cron, Hermann (2002) [1st Pub. 1937]. Imperial German Army 1914-18: Organisation, Structure, Orders-of-Battle. Helion & Co. ISBN 1-874622-70-1.
- Ellis, John; Cox, Michael (1993). The World War I Databook. Aurum Press Ltd. ISBN 1-85410-766-6.
- Histories of Two Hundred and Fifty-One Divisions of the German Army which Participated in the War (1914-1918), compiled from records of Intelligence section of the General Staff, American Expeditionary Forces, at General Headquarters, Chaumont, France 1919. The London Stamp Exchange Ltd. 1989 [1st Pub. 1920]. ISBN 0-948130-87-3.
- The German Forces in the Field; 7th Revision, 11th November 1918; Compiled by the General Staff, War Office. Imperial War Museum, London and the Battery Press. 1995 [1918]. ISBN 978-1-870423-95-3.
