= 4th Guards Infantry Division =

4th Guards Infantry Division (4. Garde-Infanterie-Division)
- Active: 1915-1919
- Country: German Empire
- Branch: Army
- Type: Infantry
- Size: Approx. 12,500
- Engagements: World War I: Gorlice-Tarnów Offensive, Battle of the Somme, Battle of Arras (1917), Passchendaele, German spring offensive, First Battle of the Somme (1918), Second Battle of the Marne

The 4th Guards Infantry Division (4. Garde-Infanterie-Division) was a unit of the Imperial German Army in World War I. The division was formed on May 18, 1915. It was part of a wave of new infantry divisions formed in the spring of 1915. The division was disbanded in 1919 during the demobilization of the German Army after World War I. It was a division of the Prussian Guards and hence recruited from all over the Kingdom of Prussia.

The division was formed primarily from the excess infantry regiments of regular infantry divisions which were being triangularized. The division's 5th Guards Infantry Brigade was transferred from the 3rd Guards Infantry Division, and came to the division with the 5th Foot Guards and the 5th Guard Grenadiers. The 93rd Reserve Infantry Regiment came from the 1st Guards Reserve Division.

== Combat chronicle ==
After formation, the division entered the line north of Przasnysz, where it remained until July 1915. It then participated in the Gorlice-Tarnów Offensive, breaking through at Przasnysz and fighting in the follow-on battles to the lower Narew and then to the upper Narew. Continuing the offensive, it crossed the Neman River in September 1915 and fought in the Battle of Vilnius. The division then went into reserve and was transferred to the Western Front. It arrived in the trenchlines in Flanders and the Artois in October and remained there until the end of the year. After four months in reserve, it returned to the line in Flanders and the Artois in April 1916. It fought in the Battle of the Somme until November 1916, and then remained in the line on the Somme until March 1917. The division then fought in the Battle of Arras and remained in the line in Flanders and the Artois until September 1917, when it entered the Battle of Passchendaele. In 1918, it participated in the German spring offensive, fighting in the First Battle of the Somme (1918), also known as the Second Battle of the Somme (to distinguish it from the 1916 battle). It remained in the line until July, when it went to a quieter sector in Lorraine to rest. In late July and August, it fought in the Second Battle of the Marne. It remained in the line until the end of the war. Allied intelligence rated the division as a first class fighting division.

== Order of battle on formation ==
The 4th Guards Infantry Division was formed as a triangular division. The order of battle of the division on May 19, 1915, was as follows:

- 5th Guards Infantry Brigade
  - 5th Foot Guards
  - 5th Guards Grenadiers
  - 93rd Reserve Infantry Regiment
  - Guards Reserve Jäger Battalion
- Staff, Guards Reserve Uhlans
  - 1st Squadron, Guards Reserve Uhlans
  - 3rd Squadron, Guards Reserve Uhlans
- 2nd Guards Field Artillery
- "1/3" 1st Company/28th (2nd Brandenburg) Pioneer-Battalion

== Late-war order of battle ==
The division underwent relatively few organizational changes over the course of the war. Cavalry was reduced, artillery and signals commands were formed, and combat engineer support was expanded to a full pioneer battalion. The order of battle on March 8, 1918, was as follows:

- 5th Guards Infantry Brigade
  - 5th Foot Guards
  - 5th Guards Grenadiers
  - 93rd Reserve Infantry Regiment
  - Maschinengewehr-Scharfschützen-Abteilung Nr. 14
- 2nd Squadron, Guard Reserve Dragoon Regiment
- 4th Guards Artillery Command
  - 6th Guards Field Artillery Regiment
  - 3rd Battalion, 1st Guards Foot Artillery Regiment
- 106th Pioneer Battalion
  - 261st Pioneer Company
  - 269th Pioneer Company
  - 4th Guards Minenwerfer Company
- 4th Guards Division Signal Command
