= William Balck =

German general (1858–1924)

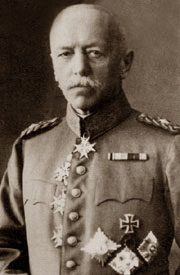
- Born: 19 October 1858; Osnabrück, Kingdom of Hanover
- Died: 15 July 1924 (aged 65); Aurich, Province of Hanover, Free State of Prussia, Weimar Republic
- Relatives: Hermann Balck (son)
- Military career
- Allegiance: German Empire
- Branch: Imperial German Army
- Service years: 1876–1919
- Rank: Generalleutnant
- Commands: 13th Landwehr Division; 51. Reserve-Division
- Conflicts: World War I
- Awards: Pour le Mérite

Konrad Friedrich August Henry William Balck (October 19, 1858 in Osnabrück – July 15, 1924 in Aurich) was a Prussian officer and military officer who reached the rank of Generalleutnant during World War I.

== Life ==
He was the son of British Lieutenant Colonel George Philipp Balck and his wife Charlotte née Lütgen, daughter of Major General Conrad Friedrich Lütgen (1790–1854) and his wife Dorothee Charlotte Lackemann.

His 1903 six-volume work Taktik (Tactics) was translated into English by Walter Krueger and published in the United States in two volumes, Introduction and Formal Tactics of Infantry in 1911 and Cavalry, Field and Heavy Artillery in Field Warfare in 1914. This translation attracted the attention of Major General Leonard Wood, the Chief of Staff of the United States Army, and was widely read, and acclaimed, by American Army officers. He was appointed as Chief Inspector of Telegraphy/Signals Troops on 9 May 1914.

At the first year of the World War I, he continued his role as chief inspector of telegraphy/signals troops. Later, he commanded the 13th Landwehr Division (August 1915 – September 1916) and 51st Reserve Division (September 1916 – March 1918).

== Awards ==
- Iron Cross (1914) 2nd and 1st Class
- Wound Badge (1918) in Black
- Order of the Crown 2nd Class with Star and Swords (1917)
- Pour le Mérite (9 March 1918)
- Order of the Red Eagle 2nd Class with Star, Oak Leaves and Swords (18 August 1918)

== Writings ==
- Taktik (Tactics) (Berlin: Eisenschmitt, 1903)
- Kriegsspiel und Übungsritt als Vorschule für die Truppenführung, (War Games and Exercise Rides as Preschool for the Leading of Combined Arms Formations) (Berlin: Eisenschmitt, 1913)
- Die englische Armee im Felde, (The English Army in the Field), (Berlin : Bath, 1913)
- Nachtgefechte und Nachtübungen, (Night Engagements and Night Exercises), (Berlin : Eisenschmidt, 1910)
- Kleiner Krieg, (Small Wars), (Berlin-Charlottenburg : Verlag Offene Worte, 1923)
- Entwickelung der Taktik im Weltkriege, (Development of Tactics in the World War), first edition (Berlin : Eisenschmidt, 1920)
- Entwickelung der Taktik im Weltkriege, (Development of Tactics in the World War), expanded edition (Berlin : R. Eisenschmidt, 1922)
