= Eduard von Below =

Eduard Georg Gustav von Below
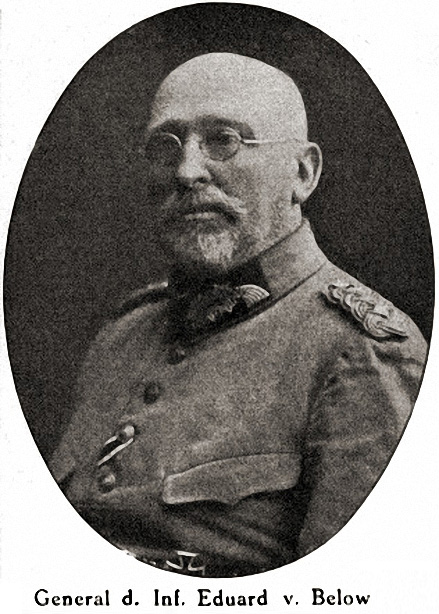
- Born: 29 December 1856; Klein Bünzow, Pomerania, Prussia
- Died: 13 January 1942 (aged 85); Eutin, Schleswig-Holstein, Nazi Germany
- Military career
- Allegiance: German Empire
- Service years: 1873–1918
- Rank: General of the Infantry
- Commands: V Corps; Army Detachment C
- Conflicts: World War I: Western Front; Battle of Saint-Mihiel
- Awards: Pour le Merite

Eduard Georg Gustav von Below (29 December 1856 - 13 January 1942) was a German General of the Infantry who notably served in World War I.

== Biography ==
=== Early life and family ===
Eduard came from the old noble family von Below. He was a son of Eduard Friedrich Wilhelm von Below (1815-1894) and his wife Marie Anna Friederike, born von Quistorp (1824-1886).

On 11 March 1887, at Scharstorf near Rostock, Below married Countess Luise Friederike Agnes von Rantzau (born 14 August 1865 in Kiel; died 15 February 1947 in Eutin). The following children were born from the marriage:

- Eduard Karl Robert (born 25 December 1887 in Rostock; died 24 December 1972 in Eutin)
- Karl Georg Ulrich Paul (born 27 June 1891 in Carlshof near Wismar; died 4 October 1973 in Bern)

=== Military career ===
Below began military service on 10 September 1873, having completed cadet school, and was commissioned a second lieutenant in the Mecklenburgian 90th Infantry Regiment "Kaiser Wilhelm" in Rostock. From 1879 he served as a battalion adjutant and the following year, until July 1883, he was seconded for further training at the Prussian Staff College. For almost two years, from April 1887 to January 1889, he was adjutant of the Rostock district command. He then returned to his regular regiment and was promoted to captain and company commander at the same time. On 18 October 1895 Below was appointed as an adjutant on the staff of the 2nd Division. While staying in this position he was promoted, on 12 September 1896, to major and formally transferred to the 45th (8th East Prussian) Infantry Regiment. From 15 June 1898 to 1 May 1903 Below was commander of the 1st Battalion of the 2nd (1st Pomeranian) Grenadier Regiment "King Frederick William IV". Having been promoted to lieutenant colonel on 18 April 1903, he was then transferred to the staff of the Guards Fusilier Regiment. On 27 January 1906 he was given the task of leading the 96th (7th Thuringian) Infantry Regiment in Gera and was finally promoted to Colonel on 10 April 1906. In 1910 Below became the commander of the 17th Infantry Brigade, stationed in Glogau. From 1 October 1912 he was commander of the 9th Division.

Below led this division as part of the 5th Army at the beginning of World War I. From 13 May 1915 to 1 February 1917 he simultaneously was deputized to lead the V Corps before being named as its official commander. In the final days of the war Below commanded Army Detachment C. Afterwards Below led his troops back home, submitted his resignation and was put up for disposition on 19 December 1918.

== Awards ==
- Order of the Red Eagle, 2nd class
- Order of the Crown, 2nd class
- Service Award Cross
- Order of the Griffon
- Reussian Cross of Honor
- Saxe-Ernestine House Order
- Iron Cross, 1st and 2nd Class
- Pour le Mérite on 18 August 1917

=== Foreign Awards ===
- Bulgaria: Order of Saint Alexander
- Russia: Order of Saint Anna, 2nd Class

== Bibliography ==
- Hanns Möller: History of the knights of the order pour le mérite in the world war. Volume I: A-L. Verlag Bernard & Graefe, Berlin 1935, pp. 60–61.
- Karl-Friedrich Hildebrand, Christian Zweng: The knights of the order Pour le Mérite of the First World War. Volume 1: A-G. Biblio Verlag, Osnabrück 1999, ISBN 3-7648-2505-7 , pp. 76–78.
