= Klein Bünzow =

- Municipality
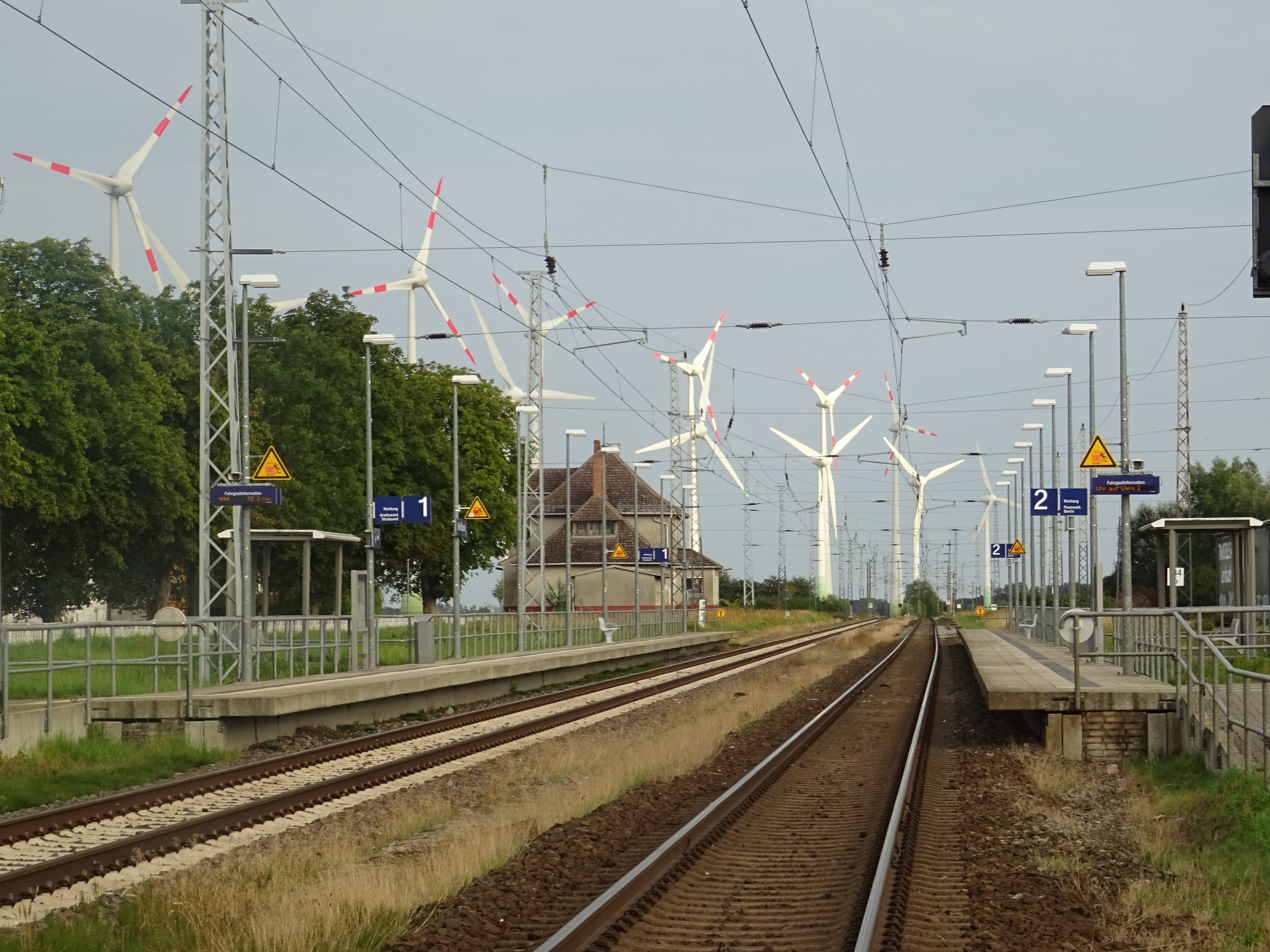
- Railway station in Klein Bünzow

- Location of Klein Bünzow within Vorpommern-Greifswald district
- Interactive map of Klein Bünzow
- Location within Germany Location within Mecklenburg-Vorpommern
- Coordinates: 53°56′N 13°38′E
- Country: Germany
- State: Mecklenburg-Vorpommern
- District: Vorpommern-Greifswald
- Municipal assoc.: Züssow
- Subdivisions: 7

Government
  - Mayor: Karl Jürgens

Area
  - Total: 34.78 km^{2} (13.43 sq mi)
- Elevation: 31 m (102 ft)

Population (2025-12-31)
  - Total: 662
  - Density: 19.0/km^{2} (49.3/sq mi)
- Time zone: UTC+01:00 (CET)
  - Summer (DST): UTC+02:00 (CEST)
- Postal codes: 17390
- Dialling codes: 039724
- Vehicle registration: VG
- Website: www.amt-zuessow.de

Klein Bünzow is a municipality in the Vorpommern-Greifswald district, in Mecklenburg-Vorpommern, Germany.

== Geography ==
Klein Bünzow is a relatively large municipality by area, located in the Vorpommern-Greifswald district in Mecklenburg-Vorpommern, Germany. It is situated in a flat, sparsely forested region without significant elevations or bodies of water. The municipality is located approximately six kilometers northwest of Anklam and about 18 kilometers east of Gützkow.

== Transport ==
Klein Bünzow railway station connects the area with Stralsund, Greifswald, Züssow, Angermünde, Eberswalde and Berlin.

== People ==
- Eduard von Below (1856-1942), German general
