= Army Group Duke Albrecht (German Empire) =

Army group of the Imperial German Army

Army Group Duke Albrecht Army Group D
- Heeresgruppe Herzog Albrecht
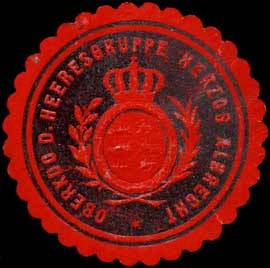
- Seal of the Army Group
- Active: 1917–1918
- Disbanded: 11 November 1918
- Country: German Empire
- Branch: German Army
- Engagements: World War I: Meuse–Argonne offensive

Commanders
- Supreme Commander: Albrecht, Duke of Württemberg

The Army Group Duke Albrecht or Army Group D (German: Heeresgruppe Herzog Albrecht) was an Army Group of the German Army, which operated on the Western Front under command of Albrecht, Duke of Württemberg, between 7 March 1917 and 11 November 1918 during World War I.

== Composition ==
- German Armee-Abteilung A (Bruno von Mudra then Johannes von Eben)
- German Armee-Abteilung B (Erich von Gündell)
- German Armee-Abteilung C (Max von Boehn then Georg Fuchs) : until 4 February 1918
- German 19th Army (Felix Graf von Bothmer then Karl von Fasbender) : from 4 February 1918

== Sources ==
- The Soldier's Burden
- Die Deutschen Heeresgruppen im Ersten Weltkrieg
- : Die deutschen Heeresgruppen Teil 1, Erster Weltkrieg
