= Armee-Abteilung C =

Army detachment that served during World War I

Armee-Abteilung Strantz Armee-Abteilung C Army Detachment C
- Flag of the Staff of an Armee Oberkommando (1871–1918)
- Active: 18 September 1914 – post 11 November 1918
- Country: German Empire
- Type: Army
- Engagements: World War I

Armee-Abteilung Strantz / Armee-Abteilung C (Army Detachment C) was an army level command of the German Army in World War I. It served on the Western Front throughout its existence.

== History ==
Armee-Abteilung C was formed on 18 September 1914 from the left (southern) wing of the 5th Army as Armee-Abteilung Strantz, named for the commander of V Corps. Strantz remained as commander of V Corps but was deputised in this post by a Divisional Commander. It was established on 2 February 1917 as Armee-Abteilung C. It was still in existence when the war ended, serving on the Western Front as part of Heeresgruppe Gallwitz.

=== Order of Battle on formation ===
The following Orders of Battle illustrate the growth of the Armee-Abteilung during the war.

Organization of Armee-Abteilung Strantz on 15 September 1914
Army	Corps	Division
Armee-Abteilung Strantz	V Corps	9th Infantry Division
Armee-Abteilung Strantz	V Corps	10th Infantry Division
Armee-Abteilung Strantz	III Bavarian Corps	5th Bavarian Division
Armee-Abteilung Strantz	III Bavarian Corps	6th Bavarian Division
Armee-Abteilung Strantz	Under Army command	33rd Reserve Division; Metz
Armee-Abteilung Strantz	Under Army command	Bavarian Cavalry Division

=== Order of Battle, 30 October 1918 ===
By the end of the war, the majority of the units assigned were lower quality Landwehr divisions.

Organization of Armee-Abteilung C on 30 October 1918
Army	Corps	Division
Armee-Abteilung C	XIII Corps	5th Guards Division
Armee-Abteilung C	XIII Corps	3rd Bavarian Division
Armee-Abteilung C	XIII Corps	241st Division
Armee-Abteilung C	V Corps	13th Landwehr Division
Armee-Abteilung C	V Corps	94th Division
Armee-Abteilung C	V Corps	35th Division (Austria-Hungary)
Armee-Abteilung C	XII Reserve Corps	5th Landwehr Division
Armee-Abteilung C	XII Reserve Corps	224th Division
Armee-Abteilung C	57th Corps (z.b.V.)	8th Landwehr Division
Armee-Abteilung C	57th Corps (z.b.V.)	255th Division
Armee-Abteilung C	Group Metz	31st Landwehr Brigade
Armee-Abteilung C	Group Metz	10th Division
Armee-Abteilung C	Group Metz	18th Landwehr Division
Armee-Abteilung C	Group Metz	2nd Landwehr Division

== Commanders ==
Armee-Abteilung C had the following commanders during its existence:

Armee-Abteilung Strantz / Armee-Abteilung C
From	Commander	Previously	Subsequently
18 September 1914	General der Infanterie Hermann von Strantz	V Corps	Active reserve status
4 February 1917	General der Infanterie Max von Boehn	IX Reserve Corps	7th Army
15 March 1917	Generalleutnant Georg Fuchs	XIV Reserve Corps	5th Army
9 November 1918	General der Infanterie Eduard von Below	V Corps	Active reserve status

== Glossary ==
- Armee-Abteilung or Army Detachment in the sense of "something detached from an Army". It is not under the command of an Army so is in itself a small Army.
- Armee-Gruppe or Army Group in the sense of a group within an Army and under its command, generally formed as a temporary measure for a specific task.
- Heeresgruppe or Army Group in the sense of a number of armies under a single commander.

== See also ==
- German Army order of battle, Western Front (1918)
- V Corps

== Bibliography ==
- Cron, Hermann (2002). Imperial German Army 1914–18: Organisation, Structure, Orders-of-Battle [first published: 1937]. Helion & Co. ISBN 1-874622-70-1.
- Ellis, John; Cox, Michael (1993). The World War I Databook. Aurum Press Ltd. ISBN 1-85410-766-6.
