= 87th Infantry Division (German Empire) =

87th Infantry Division (87. Infanterie-Division)
- Active: 1914-1919
- Country: German Empire
- Branch: Army
- Type: Infantry
- Size: Approx. 12,500
- Engagements: World War I: Gorlice-Tarnów Offensive, Second Battle of the Marne

The 87th Infantry Division (87. Infanterie-Division) was a formation of the Imperial German Army in World War I. The division was formed in February 1915 as the provisional Dickhuth Corps (Korps Dickhuth), named after its commander, and became the 87th Infantry Division in August 1915. The division was disbanded in 1919 during the demobilization of the German Army after World War I.

== Combat chronicle ==
The 87th Infantry Division initially served on the Eastern Front, fighting on the Polish frontier and in the Gorlice-Tarnów Offensive. It fought in the battle of Lake Njemen and the battle of Vilnius in September 1915. From October 1915 to September 1917, the division occupied the line between Lake Narač and Lake Drūkšiai. In November/December 1917, it occupied the line near Daugavpils. After the armistice on the Eastern Front, the division remained stationary on the armistice line until February and March 1918, when it was involved in fighting in the Baltic region. At the end of March 1918, the division was transferred to the Western Front, where it entered the line in the Champagne region. It later fought against the Allied counterattacks in the Second Battle of the Marne. The division remained on various parts of the front until the end of the war. Allied intelligence rated the division as fourth class.

== Order of battle on formation ==
On 11 November 1914, Korps Dickhuth (Thorn) consisted of

- 99. Reserve Infantry Brigade des XXV Reserve Korps
- 21 Landwehr Brigade
- Brigade Westernhagen (Landwehr and Landsturm)
- Total 20 Btle, 7 Esk, 12 Bttrn

On 8 February 1915, Korps Dickhuth (Thorn) as organized as follows:

- 75th Infantry Brigade
  - Infantry Regiment 146
  - Infantry Regiment 150
  - II Abteilung/Field Artillery Regiment 82
- Brigade Griepenkerl
  - Reserve Infantry Regiment Leinbach
  - Infantry Regiment Runge (4 Btl)
  - Festungs MG Abt 6
  - Festungs MG Abt 14
  - Ersatz/Ulan Regiment 4
  - Squadron v. Sprenger
  - one 9-Cm battery
  - 4th Battery/2d Guard Reserve Foot Artillery Rgt (Heavy Field Howitzers)
  - 1st Landwehr Pioneer Company of the Guard Corps
- Detachment Plantier
  - Field Battalions Reiser & Schwartz
  - II Battalion/Landwehr Infantry Regiment 38
  - cavalry foot detachment from the Austro-Hungarian 3rd Cavalry Division
  - Landsturm Squadron Posen
  - 2nd Battery/Field Artillery Regiment 82
  - Two Horse Batteries from the Austro-Hungarian 3rd Cavalry Division
- ½ Landwehr Foot Artillery Battalion Posen II (Heavy Field Howitzers)
- 8th Battery/Foot Artillery Regiment 11 (15-Cm Cannon)
- 2nd Ersatz Battery/Foot Artillery Regiment 28 (15-Cm Cannon)
- Vistula Flotilla (2 Armored Steamers, 22 Motorboats, 3 Tenders)

The 87th Infantry Division was formed as a square division. The order of battle of the division on 20 August 1915 was as follows:

- 173. Infanterie-Brigade
  - Infanterie-Regiment Nr. 345
  - Infanterie-Regiment Nr. 346
- 179. Infanterie-Brigade
  - Infanterie-Regiment Nr. 347
  - Landsturm-Infanterie-Regiment Nr. 8
- Kavallerie-Regiment Nr. 87
- Feldartillerie-Regiment Nr. 87
- 4. Kompanie/Pionier-Bataillon Nr. 26
- 2. Garde-Landwehr-Pionier-Kompanie

== Late-war order of battle ==
The division underwent a number of organizational changes over the course of the war. It was triangularized in December 1917. Cavalry was reduced, artillery and signals commands were formed, and combat engineer support was expanded to a full pioneer battalion. The order of battle on 24 February 1918 was as follows:

- 179. Infanterie-Brigade
  - Infanterie-Regiment Nr. 345
  - Infanterie-Regiment Nr. 347
  - Reserve-Ersatz-Infanterie-Regiment Nr. 3
  - Radfahrer-Kompanie Nr. 156
- 1.Eskadron/Grenadier-Regiment zu Pferde 3
- Artillerie-Kommandeur 3
  - Feldartillerie-Regiment Nr. 38
- Stab Pionier-Bataillon Nr. 87
  - 3. Landwehr-Kompanie/Pionier-Bataillon Nr. 6
  - 2. Ersatz-Kompanie/Pionier-Bataillon Nr. 25
  - Minenwerfer-Kompanie Nr. 87
- Divisions-Nachrichten-Kommandeur 87
