= 1st Bavarian Landwehr Division =

1st Bavarian Landwehr Division (1. Bayerische Landwehr-Division)
- Active: 1914-1919
- Country: Kingdom of Bavaria/German Empire
- Branch: Army
- Type: Infantry
- Engagements: World War I: Battle of the Frontiers

The 1st Bavarian Landwehr Division (1. Bayerische Landwehr-Division) was a unit of the Bavarian Army, part of the Imperial German Army, in World War I. The division was formed on August 21, 1914, as the "Reinforced Bavarian Landwehr Division" (Verstärkte Bayerische Landwehr-Division) and was also known initially as the Wening Division (Division Wening), named after its commander, Otto Wening. It became the 1st Bavarian Landwehr Division in September 1914. The division was disbanded in 1919 during the demobilization of the German Army after World War I.

The division was formed from various separate Landwehr units. Although called Bavarian, the division initially included several non-Bavarian units: the 14th Landwehr Infantry Brigade included one Bavarian and one Württemberg regiment; the 60th Landwehr Infantry Brigade (initially commanded by Lt. Gen. Hans von Blumenthal, who had come out of retirement) comprised a regiment formed in Alsace-Lorraine and another formed in Thuringia (which included Prussians and soldiers from the principalities of the Reuss Junior Line and Schwarzburg-Sondershausen). The 60th Landwehr Infantry Brigade would be transferred to the newly formed 13th Landwehr Division in May 1915. In January 1916, the 1st Bavarian Landwehr Division was reorganized and became all-Bavarian.

== Combat chronicle ==
The 1st Bavarian Landwehr Division served on the Western Front, initially seeing action in the Battle of the Frontiers. From September 1914 to the end of May 1915, it fought south of Dieuze. From June 1915 to November 1918, the division occupied the line in Lorraine. Allied intelligence rated the division as fourth class; it was considered primarily a sector holding unit and remained generally on the defensive except for various raids.

== Order of battle on formation ==
The 1st Bavarian Landwehr Division was formed as a two-brigade square division, and received a third brigade in September 1914. The order of battle of the division on December 4, 1914, was as follows:

- 13. Bayerische Landwehr-Infanterie-Brigade
  - Kgl. Bayer. Landwehr-Infanterie-Regiment Nr. 8
  - Kgl. Bayer. Landwehr-Infanterie-Regiment Nr. 10
- 14. Bayerische Landwehr-Infanterie-Brigade
  - Kgl. Württemb. Landwehr-Infanterie-Regiment Nr. 122
  - Kgl. Bayer. Landwehr-Infanterie-Regiment Nr. 15
- 60. Landwehr-Infanterie-Brigade
  - Landwehr-Infanterie-Regiment Nr. 60
  - Thüringisches Landwehr-Infanterie-Regiment Nr. 71
- Kavallerie-Ersatz-Abteilung/2.Garde-Ulanen-Regiment
- 1. Landwehr-Eskadron/II. Bayerisches Armeekorps
- Ersatz-Abteilung/2. Westfälisches Feldartillerie-Regiment Nr. 22
- Ersatz-Abteilung/Straßburger Feldartillerie-Regiment Nr. 84
- Kgl. Bayerische Landsturm-Batterie Landau
- 1. Landwehr-Pionier-Kompanie/II. Bayerisches Armeekorps

== Late-war order of battle ==
The division underwent a number of organizational changes over the course of the war. It was triangularized in September 1916. Cavalry was reduced, artillery and signals commands were formed, and combat engineer support was expanded to a full battalion. The order of battle on February 15, 1918, was as follows:

- 5. Bayerische Landwehr-Infanterie-Brigade
  - Kgl. Bayer. Landwehr-Infanterie-Regiment Nr. 4
  - Kgl. Bayer. Landwehr-Infanterie-Regiment Nr. 6
  - Kgl. Bayer. Landwehr-Infanterie-Regiment Nr. 7
  - Maschinengewehr-Scharfschützen-Abteilung Nr. 6
- 3. Eskadron/Kgl. Bayer. 8. Chevaulegers-Regiment
- Kgl. Bayer. Artillerie-Kommandeur 22
  - Kgl. Bayer. Landwehr-Feldartillerie-Regiment Nr. 1
- Stab Kgl. Bayer. Pionier-Bataillon Nr. 24
  - Kgl. Bayer. Reserve-Pionier-Kompanie Nr. 18
  - Kgl. Bayer. Landwehr-Pionier-Kompanie Nr. 1
  - Kgl. Bayer. Minenwerfer-Kompanie Nr. 301
- Kgl. Bayer. Divisions-Nachrichten-Kommandeur 501
