= 83rd Infantry Division (German Empire) =

83rd Infantry Division (83. Infanterie-Division)
- Active: 1914-1919
- Country: German Empire
- Branch: Army
- Type: Infantry
- Size: Approx. 12,500
- Engagements: World War I: Battle of Łódź (1914)

The 83rd Infantry Division (83. Infanterie-Division) was a formation of the Imperial German Army in World War I. The division was formed in November 1914 as the "Division Posen 1", part of the Posen Corps (Korps Posen), and became the 83rd Infantry Division in June 1915. It was initially formed from the garrison infantry regiments of Fortress Posen (Festung Posen). The division was disbanded in 1919 during the demobilization of the German Army after World War I.

== Combat chronicle ==
Division Posen 1 initially served on the Eastern Front, fighting in Poland, including at the 1914 Battle of Łódź, and then spent most of the period until mid-1915 fighting along the Rawka and Bzura Rivers. On 2 June 1915 it became the 83rd Infantry Division. It fought on the Narew River in July and August 1915 and participated in the capture of Białystok on 26 August 1915, and the subsequent conquest of Grodno. Until April 1917, it occupied the line along the Berezina River and was then along the Servech and Shchara Rivers for several months. It remained in the Bukovina region until the armistice on the Eastern Front. In March 1918, the division was sent to the Western Front, where it initially occupied the line in Lorraine and then moved to Flanders. It went to the Somme region in August and returned to Lorraine in September, where it was for the remainder of the war. Allied intelligence rated the division as fourth class.

== Order of battle on formation ==
The 83rd Infantry Division was formed as a square division. The order of battle of the division on 14 June 1915 was as follows:

- 165. Infanterie-Brigade
  - Infanterie-Regiment Nr. 329
  - Infanterie-Regiment Nr. 330
- 166. Infanterie-Brigade
  - Infanterie-Regiment Nr. 331
  - Infanterie-Regiment Nr. 332
- Ersatz-Eskadron/Ulanen-Regiment (1. Brandenburgisches) Nr. 3
- 5.Landsturm-Eskadron/V. Armeekorps
- Stab Feldartillerie-Regiment Nr. 55
  - Ersatz-Abteilung/2. Großherzoglich-Hessisches Feldartillerie-Regiment Nr. 61
  - 1. Ersatz-Abteilung/Feldartillerie-Regiment von Podbielski (1. Niederschlesisches) Nr. 5
  - Fußartillerie-Bataillon Nr. 112
- Landwehr-Pionier-Kompanie/XIX. Armeekorps

== Late-war order of battle ==
The division underwent a number of organizational changes over the course of the war. It was triangularized in September 1917, losing the 332nd Infantry Regiment. Cavalry was reduced, artillery and signals commands were formed, and combat engineer support was expanded to a full pioneer battalion. The order of battle on 15 April 1918 was as follows:

- 165. Infanterie-Brigade
  - Infanterie-Regiment Nr. 329
  - Infanterie-Regiment Nr. 330
  - Infanterie-Regiment Nr. 331
- 3. Eskadron/Dragoner-Regiment von Wedel (Pommersches) Nr. 11
- Artillerie-Kommandeur 80
  - Feldartillerie-Regiment Nr. 249
  - III.Bataillon/Fußartillerie-Regiment Nr. 28
- Stab Pionier-Bataillon Nr. 83
  - 1.Landwehr-Pionier-Kompanie/I. Armeekorps
  - 1.Landwehr-Pionier-Kompanie/V. Armeekorps
  - Minenwerfer-Kompanie Nr. 83
- Divisions-Nachrichten-Kommandeur 83
