= 1st Reserve Division (German Empire) =

1st Reserve Division (1. Reserve-Division)
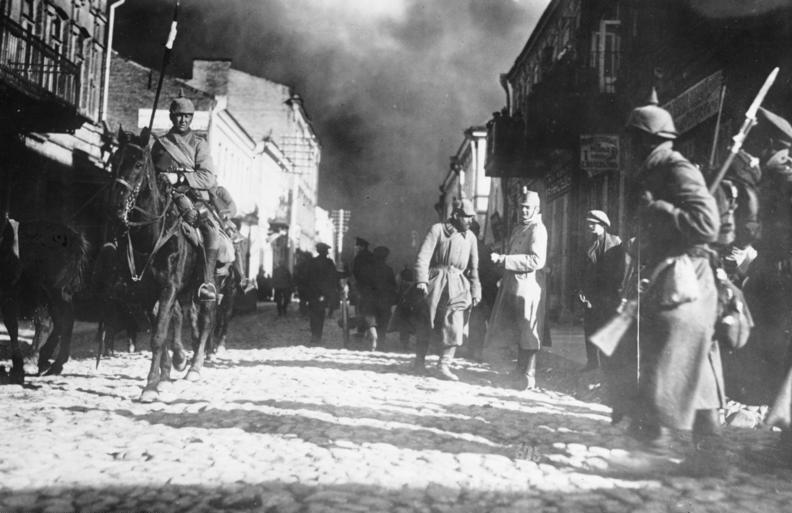
- German troops in Lithuania in July 1915
- Active: 1914-1919
- Country: Germany
- Branch: Army
- Type: Infantry
- Size: Approx. 15,000 World War I: Gumbinnen, Tannenberg, 1st Masurian Lakes, Łódź, German spring offensive, Hundred Days Offensive

The 1st Reserve Division (1. Reserve-Division) was a reserve infantry division of the Imperial German Army in World War I. It was formed, on mobilization in August 1914, from reserve infantry units, primarily from East Prussia, and was part of I Reserve Corps. The division served on the Eastern Front from the beginning of the war until October 1917, after which it was transferred to the Western Front for the war's final campaigns. Allied intelligence rated it a third-class division, mainly due to its losses in heavy fighting and reduced quality of replacement troops.

== August 1914 organization ==
The 1st Reserve Division's initial wartime organization was as follows:

- 1.Reserve-Infanterie-Brigade:
  - Reserve-Infanterie-Regiment Nr. 1
  - Reserve-Infanterie-Regiment Nr. 3
- 72.Reserve-Infanterie-Brigade:
  - Reserve-Infanterie-Regiment Nr. 18
  - Reserve-Infanterie-Regiment Nr. 59
  - Reserve-Jäger-Bataillon Nr. 1
- Reserve-Ulanen-Regiment Nr. 1
- Reserve-Feldartillerie-Regiment Nr. 1
- 4./Pommersches Pionier-Bataillon Nr. 2

== Late World War I organization ==
Divisions underwent many changes during the war, with regiments moving from division to division, and some being destroyed and rebuilt. During the war, most divisions became triangular - one infantry brigade with three infantry regiments rather than two infantry brigades of two regiments (a "square division"). The 1st Reserve Division triangularized in June 1917. An artillery commander replaced the artillery brigade headquarters, the cavalry was further reduced, the engineer contingent was increased, and a divisional signals command was created. The 1st Reserve Division's order of battle on January 1, 1918, was as follows:

- 1.Reserve-Infanterie-Brigade:
  - Ostpreußisches Reserve-Infanterie-Regiment Nr. 1
  - Ostpreußisches Reserve-Infanterie-Regiment Nr. 3
  - Posensches Reserve-Infanterie-Regiment Nr. 59
- 4.Eskadron/2. Garde-Ulanen-Regiment
- Artillerie-Kommandeur 71:
  - Reserve-Feldartillerie-Regiment Nr. 1
  - II./Reserve-Fußartillerie-Regiment Nr. 1
- Stab Pionier-Bataillon Nr. 301:
  - 4./Pommersches Pionier-Bataillon Nr. 2
  - 1.Reserve-Kompanie/Pionier-Bataillon Nr. 34
  - Minenwerfer-Kompanie Nr. 201
- Divisions-Nachrichten-Kommandeur 401
