= 1st Guards Reserve Division (German Empire) =

1st Guard Reserve Division (1. Garde-Reserve-Division)
- Active: 1914-1919
- Country: Germany
- Branch: Army
- Type: Infantry
- Size: Approx. 15,000
- Part of: Guard Reserve Corps (Garde-Reservekorps)

The 1st Guards Reserve Division (1. Garde-Reserve-Division) was a reserve infantry division of the Imperial German Army in World War I. It was a reserve formation of the Prussian Guards, the elite regiments raised throughout the Kingdom of Prussia. It was formed on mobilization in August 1914 as part of the Guards Reserve Corps and dissolved in 1919 during the demobilization of the German Army after the Armistice.

The division saw action on both the Western and Eastern Fronts during World War I. It was not heavily engaged in the war's major well-known battles, but was rated by Allied intelligence as a dependable division willing to take losses to hold and retake the line.

== Order of battle on mobilization ==
On mobilization in August 1914, the reserves of the Prussian Guards were called up and formed into the 1st Guard Reserve Division. The 1st Guard Reserve Division's initial wartime organization was as follows:

- 1.Garde-Reserve-Infanterie-Brigade:
  - 1. Garde-Reserve-Infanterie-Regiment
  - 2. Garde-Reserve-Infanterie-Regiment
  - Garde-Reserve-Jäger-Bataillon
- 15.Reserve-Infanterie-Brigade:
  - Reserve-Infanterie-Regiment Nr. 64
  - Reserve-Infanterie-Regiment Nr. 93
  - Garde-Reserve-Schützen-Bataillon
- Garde-Reserve-Dragoner-Regiment
- Garde-Reserve-Feldartillerie-Brigade:
  - 1.Garde-Reserve-Feldartillerie-Regiment
  - 3.Garde-Reserve-Feldartillerie-Regiment
- 2./2. Brandenburgisches Pionier-Bataillon Nr. 28
- 3./2. Brandenburgisches Pionier-Bataillon Nr. 28

== Order of battle on February 23, 1918 ==
Divisions underwent many changes during the war, with regiments moving from division to division, and some being destroyed and rebuilt. During the war, most divisions became triangular - one infantry brigade with three infantry regiments rather than two infantry brigades of two regiments (a "square division"). An artillery commander replaced the artillery brigade headquarters, the cavalry was further reduced, the engineer contingent was increased, and a divisional signals command was created. The 1st Guard Reserve Division's order of battle on February 23, 1918, was as follows:

- 1. Garde-Reserve-Infanterie-Brigade:
  - 1. Garde-Reserve-Infanterie-Regiment
  - 2. Garde-Reserve-Infanterie-Regiment
  - Garde-Reserve-Infanterie-Regiment Nr. 64
  - MG-Scharfschützen-Abteilung Nr. 70
- 1. Eskadron/Garde-Reserve-Dragoner-Regiment
- Garde-Artillerie-Kommandeur 8:
  - 1.Garde-Reserve-Feldartillerie-Regiment
  - II./2.Garde-Reserve-Fußartillerie-Regiment
- Stab 2. Brandenburgisches Pionier-Bataillon Nr. 28:
  - 2./2. Brandenburgisches Pionier-Bataillon Nr. 28
  - 3./2. Brandenburgisches Pionier-Bataillon Nr. 28
  - 5.Garde-Minenwerfer-Kompanie
- Divisions-Nachrichten-Abteilung Nr. 401
