= 204th Infantry Division (German Empire) =

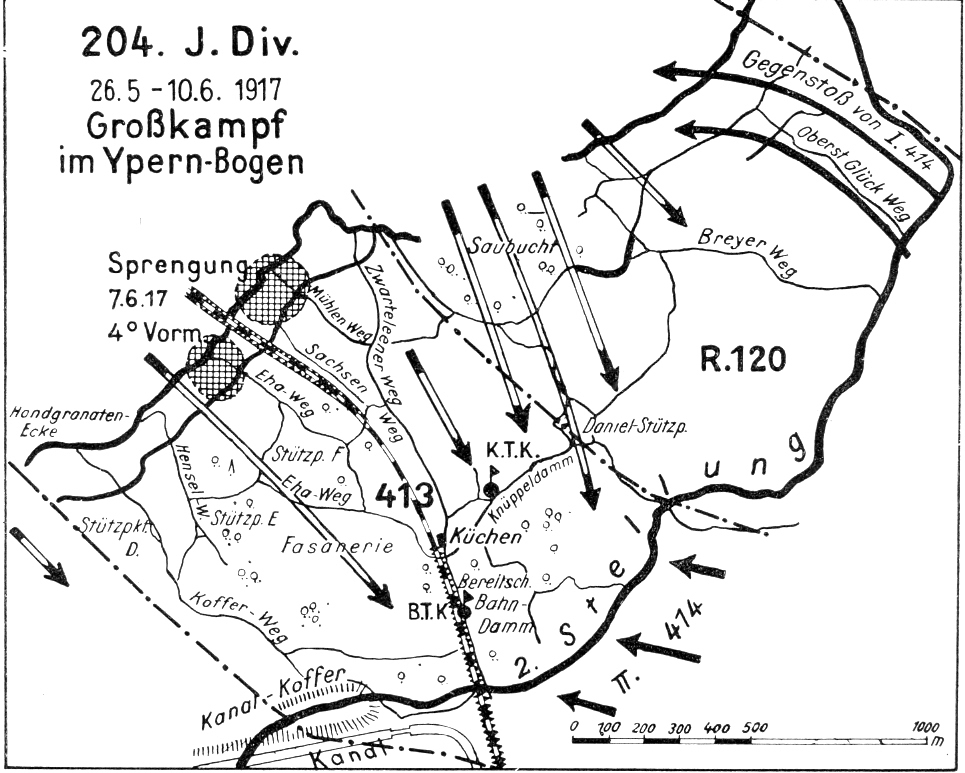
- Allegiance: German Empire
- Branch: Imperial German Army
- Engagements: World War I

The 204th Infantry Division (204. Infanterie-Division) was a formation of the Imperial German Army in World War I. It fought on the Western Front from its formation in 1916 to the end of the war.
