= Georg Fuchs =

Prussian General of the Infantry

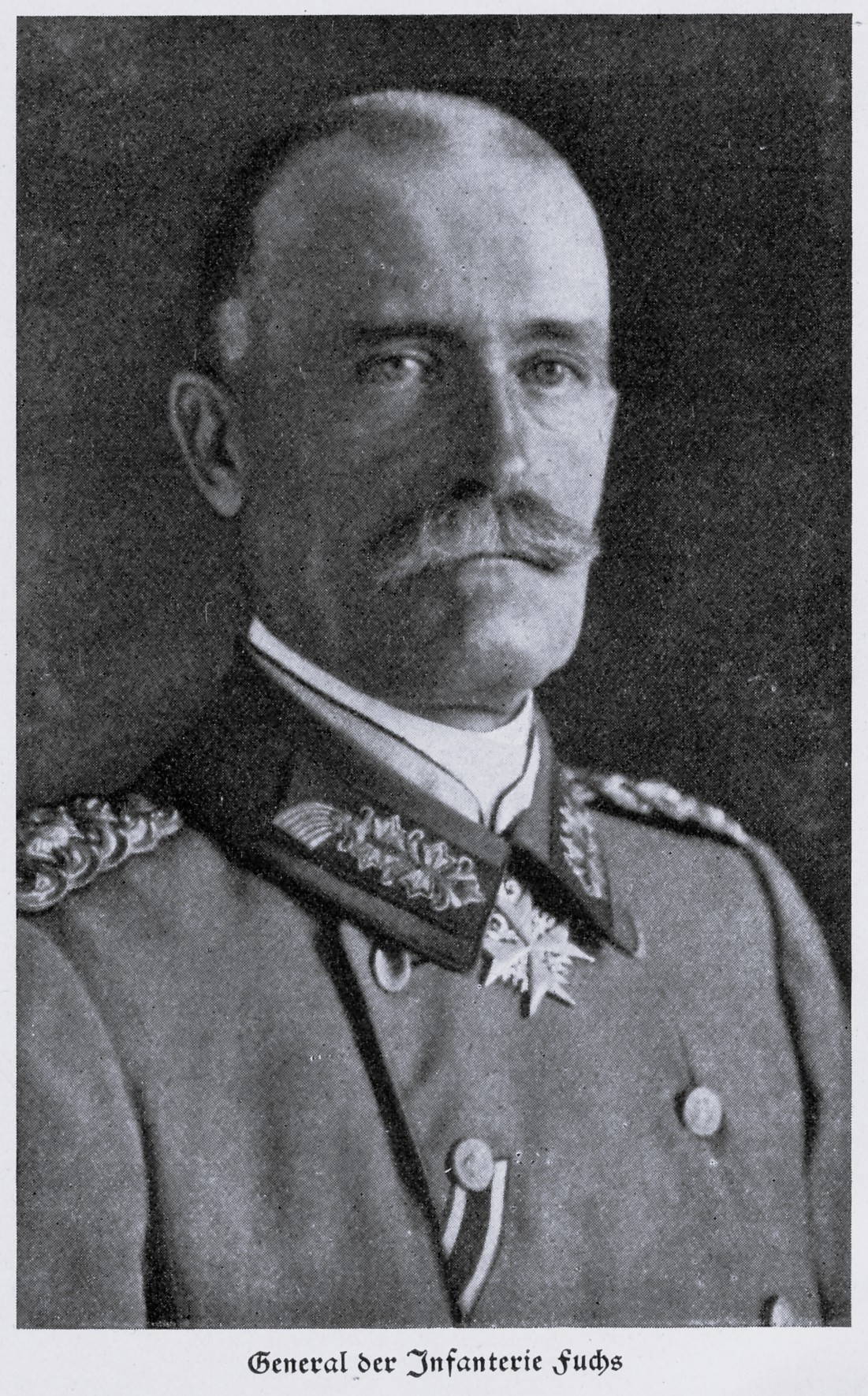
- General of the Infantry, Georg Fuchs
- Born: Georg Fuchs; December 25, 1856; Danzig, Kingdom of Prussia
- Died: September 30, 1939 (aged 82); Münster, Nazi Germany
- Military career
- Allegiance: Kingdom of Prussia; German Empire
- Branch: Prussian Army; Imperial German Army
- Service years: 1877 – 1918
- Rank: General of the Infantry
- Commands: 4th Lower Alsatian Infantry Regiment No. 143; 20th Infantry Brigade; 16th Division; X Reserve Corps; XIV Reserve Corps; Armee-Abteilung C
- Conflicts: World War I: Battle of Neufchâteau; Battle of the Somme; Battle of Saint-Mihiel
- Awards: Order of the Red Eagle; Pour le Mérite; Order of Franz Joseph

Georg Fuchs (December 25, 1856 ― September 30, 1939) was a Prussian General of the Infantry who notably served during World War I.

== Career ==
After graduating college in 1877 Fuchs joined the Prussian Army and later became a Fahnenjunker in the 33rd (East Prussian) Fusiliers "Count Roon". He received his commission as a second lieutenant on February 11, 1879. From 1885 he attended the Prussian Staff College for three years, being promoted to Oberleutnant. This allowed him to join the German General Staff in 1890. As a Hauptmann he led a company in the Magdeburg Fusilier Regiment No. 36 in Halle (Saale) in 1894. After being promoted to major in 1898, he taught at the Prussian War Academy for two years. He was promoted to Oberstleutnant in 1905 and became chief of staff of the IX Corps in Altona, Hamburg.

Upon reaching the rank of Oberst, he commanded the 4th Lower Alsatian Infantry Regiment No. 143 and the 20th Infantry Brigade once promoted to Generalmajor in 1911. When he was promoted to Generalleutnant he was given command of the 16th Division.

=== World War I ===
At the beginning of World War I he was commissioned for the Occupation of the Grand Duchy of Luxembourg on August 2, 1914. He then fought in association with the VIII Corps during the Battle of Neufchâteau.

At the end of August 1916, he became the commanding general of the X Reserve Corps. In October, his command shifted to the XIV Reserve Corps which was the main area of attack of the British Fifth Army during the Battle of the Somme.

In March, 1917 he took command over Armee-Abteilung C between the Meuse and Moselle rivers. After an offensive from the First United States Army, he had to give up positions east of Verdun during the Battle of Saint-Mihiel in mid-September, 1918.

After the Armistice, Fuchs was given command of the Fifth Army in December, 1918.

== Awards and decorations ==
Among Fuchs's awards and decorations were:

- Order of the Red Eagle, 2nd Class with Oak Leaves
- Order of the Crown, 2nd Class with Star
- Prussian Service Award Cross
- Knight's Cross 1st Class of the Zähringer Lion
- Order of the Griffon
- House and Merit Order of Peter Frederick Louis
- Princely Reuss Honor Cross, 2nd Class
- Commander´s Cross of the Order of Franz Joseph
- Iron Cross, 2nd and 1st Class
- Pour le Mérite on 22 August 1917
