= 19th Ersatz Division =

19th Ersatz Division (19. Ersatz-Division)
- Active: 1914-1919
- Country: Kingdom of Saxony; German Empire
- Branch: Army
- Type: Infantry
- Size: Approx. 15,000
- Engagements: World War I: Battle of the Frontiers, Second Battle of the Marne

The 19th Ersatz Division (19. Ersatz-Division) was a unit of the German Army, in World War I. The division was formed on the mobilization of the German Army in August 1914. The division was disbanded in 1919, during the demobilization of the German Army after World War I.

== Formation and recruitment ==
The 19th Ersatz Division was formed on mobilization from 11 brigade replacement battalions (Brigade-Ersatz-Bataillone). Each brigade replacement battalion was numbered after its parent infantry brigade, and was formed with two companies taken from the replacement battalion of each of the brigade's two infantry regiments. One brigade replacement battalion was formed by three regiments. Thus, collectively, the 11 brigade replacement battalions represented troop contributions from 23 different infantry regiments.

The units of the 21st Mixed Ersatz Brigade were raised from the VI Army Corps area, which covered most of the Prussian Province of Silesia. These units were disbanded after the opening fighting in Lorraine, with their troops sent to other units in mid-September 1914. Alternatively, it is possible that the brigade remained in Silesia and was attached to the 4th Landwehr Division. The sources are in conflict. On 26 August the brigade was with the 4th Landwehr Division in the east. The other two brigades of the division were from the Kingdom of Saxony. The units of the 45th Mixed Ersatz Brigade were raised from the XII (1st Royal Saxon) Corps area, which covered eastern Saxony. The units of the 47th Mixed Ersatz Brigade were raised from the XIX (2nd Royal Saxon) Corps area, which covered western and southern Saxony. Thus, after the dissolution of the 21st Mixed Ersatz Brigade, the division became a fully Saxon unit.

== Combat chronicle ==
The 19th Ersatz Division fought on the Western Front in World War I. It fought in the Battle of the Frontiers, seeing action in Lorraine. With occasional rests, it remained in the trenchlines in Lorraine until October 1916. It was then in the line near Verdun until July 1918. That month, it went into the line near Reims. It was there when it met the Allied Aisne-Marne Offensive, part of the Second Battle of the Marne. After the severe fighting there, the division left the line for rest and reconstruction. In late August, it fought against the Allied Oise-Aisne Offensive. It was then returned to a quiet sector in Lorraine, where it remained until the end of the war. Allied intelligence rated the division as third class.

== Order of battle on mobilization ==
The order of battle of the 19th Ersatz Division on mobilization in August 1914 was as follows:

- 21. gemischte Ersatz-Brigade (detached to 4 Landwehr Division)
  - Brigade-Ersatz-Bataillon Nr. 21
  - Brigade-Ersatz-Bataillon Nr. 22
  - Brigade-Ersatz-Bataillon Nr. 23
  - Brigade-Ersatz-Bataillon Nr. 24
  - Brigade-Ersatz-Bataillon Nr. 78
  - Kavallerie-Ersatz-Abteilung Breslau/VI. Armeekorps
  - Feldartillerie-Ersatz-Abteilung Nr. 6 (Ersatz-Abteilung/Feldartillerie-Regiment Nr. 6)
  - Feldartillerie-Ersatz-Abteilung Nr. 57 (Ersatz-Abteilung/Feldartillerie-Regiment Nr. 57)
- Kgl. Sächsische 45. gemischte Ersatz-Brigade
  - Brigade-Ersatz-Bataillon Nr. 45
  - Brigade-Ersatz-Bataillon Nr. 46
  - Brigade-Ersatz-Bataillon Nr. 63
  - Brigade-Ersatz-Bataillon Nr. 64
  - Kgl. Sächsische Kavallerie-Ersatz-Abteilung Dresden/XII. Armeekorps
  - Kgl. Sächsische Feldartillerie-Ersatz-Abteilung Nr. 28 (Ersatz-Abteilung/Feldartillerie-Regiment Nr. 28)
  - Kgl. Sächsische Feldartillerie-Ersatz-Abteilung Nr. 48 (Ersatz-Abteilung/Feldartillerie-Regiment Nr. 48)
  - 1.Ersatz-Kompanie/Kgl. Sächsisches 1. Pionier-Bataillon Nr. 12
- Kgl. Sächsische 47. gemischte Ersatz-Brigade
  - Brigade-Ersatz-Bataillon Nr. 47
  - Brigade-Ersatz-Bataillon Nr. 48
  - Brigade-Ersatz-Bataillon Nr. 88
  - Brigade-Ersatz-Bataillon Nr. 89
  - Kgl. Sächsische Kavallerie-Ersatz-Abteilung Leipzig/XIX. Armeekorps
  - Kgl. Sächsische Feldartillerie-Ersatz-Abteilung Nr. 32 (Ersatz-Abteilung/Feldartillerie-Regiment Nr. 32)
  - Kgl. Sächsische Feldartillerie-Ersatz-Abteilung Nr. 77 (Ersatz-Abteilung/Feldartillerie-Regiment Nr. 77)
  - 1.Ersatz-Kompanie/Kgl. Sächsisches 2. Pionier-Bataillon Nr. 22

== Order of battle on 12 July 1918 ==
The division underwent several structural changes as the war progressed. As noted above, the Silesian brigade was dissolved early in the war. The other Saxon mixed Ersatz brigades were converted to Ersatz infantry brigades as cavalry, artillery, and pioneer Ersatz units were grouped and reorganized. The brigade replacement battalions were grouped into Ersatz infantry regiments. The 19th Ersatz Division was triangularized in October 1916. Cavalry was reduced, pioneers were increased to a full battalion, and an artillery command and a divisional signals command were created. The division's order of battle on 12 July 1918 was as follows:

- 45. Ersatz-Brigade
  - Kgl. Sächsisches Ersatz-Infanterie-Regiment Nr. 23
  - Kgl. Sächsisches Ersatz-Infanterie-Regiment Nr. 24
  - Kgl. Sächsisches Ersatz-Infanterie-Regiment Nr. 32
- 5.Eskadron/Kgl. Sächsisches 2. Husaren-Regiment Nr. 19
- Kgl. Sächsischer Artillerie-Kommandeur 137
  - Kgl. Sächsisches Ersatz-Feldartillerie-Regiment Nr. 47
- Kgl. Sächsisches Pionier-Bataillon Nr. 519
  - 1.Ersatz-Kompanie/Kgl. Sächsisches 1. Pionier-Bataillon Nr. 12
  - 1.Ersatz-Kompanie/Kgl. Sächsisches 2. Pionier-Bataillon Nr. 22
  - Kgl. Sächsische Minenwerfer-Kompanie Nr. 164
- Kgl. Sächsischer Divisions-Nachrichten-Kommandeur 569
