= 2nd Bavarian Landwehr Division =

2nd Bavarian Landwehr Division (2. Bayerische Landwehr-Division)
- Active: 1914-1919
- Country: Bavaria/German Empire
- Branch: Army
- Type: Infantry
- Size: Approx. 12,500
- Engagements: World War I: Battle of Riga

The 2nd Bavarian Landwehr Division (2. Bayerische Landwehr-Division) was a unit of the Bavarian Army, part of the Imperial German Army, in World War I. The division was formed on December 31, 1916. It was disbanded in 1919 during the demobilization of the German Army after World War I. It was composed primarily of troops of the Landwehr.

== Combat chronicle ==
The 2nd Bavarian Landwehr Division initially served on the Eastern Front, entering the line in the Baltic region near Riga. In September 1917, it participated in the Battle of Riga. The division then remained on the line on the Duna River until the armistice on the Eastern Front in December 1917. For most of 1918, it served in Livonia and Estonia as part of the German occupation forces. In October 1918, it was transferred to the Western Front, and occupied a portion of the trenchline in Lorraine until the end of World War I. Allied intelligence rated the division as fourth class.

== Order of battle on formation ==
The 2nd Bavarian Landwehr Division was formed as a triangular division with one brigade of three infantry regiments. The order of battle of the division on February 19, 1917, was as follows:

- 9. bayerische Landwehr-Brigade
  - Kgl. Bayerisches Landwehr-Infanterie-Regiment Nr. 2
  - Kgl. Bayerisches Landwehr-Infanterie-Regiment Nr. 5
  - Kgl. Bayerisches Landwehr-Infanterie-Regiment Nr. 10
- 3.Eskadron/Kgl. Bayerisches Reserve-Kavallerie-Regiment Nr. 1
- Kgl. Bayerisches Landwehr-Feldartillerie-Regiment Nr. 2
- Stab Kgl. Bayerisches Pionier-Bataillon Nr. 25
  - Kgl. Bayerische Landwehr-Pionier-Kompanie Nr. 2
  - Kgl. Bayerische Landwehr-Pionier-Kompanie Nr. 3
  - Kgl. Bayerische Minenwerfer-Kompanie Nr. 502

== Late-war order of battle ==
As German divisional organizations had become fairly standardized by late 1916 when the division was formed, it underwent relatively few organizational changes over the course of the war. It received a divisional signals command in September 1917, and did not receive an artillery command until October 1918. The order of battle on March 4, 1918, was as follows:

- 6. bayerische Landwehr-Brigade:
  - Kgl. Bayerisches Landwehr-Infanterie-Regiment Nr. 2
  - Kgl. Bayerisches Landwehr-Infanterie-Regiment Nr. 5
  - Kgl. Bayerisches Landwehr-Infanterie-Regiment Nr. 10
- 3.Eskadron/Kgl. Bayerisches Reserve-Kavallerie-Regiment Nr. 1
- Kgl. Bayerisches Landwehr-Feldartillerie-Regiment Nr. 2
- Stab Kgl. Bayerisches Pionier-Bataillon Nr. 25
  - Kgl. Bayerische Landwehr-Pionier-Kompanie Nr. 2
  - Kgl. Bayerische Landwehr-Pionier-Kompanie Nr. 3
  - Kgl. Bayerische Minenwerfer-Kompanie Nr. 502
- Kgl. Bayerischer Divisions-Nachrichten-Kommandeur 502
