= 13th Landwehr Division =

- 13. Landwehr-Division
- Active: World War I
- Country: German Empire
- Allegiance: Imperial German Army

The 13th Landwehr Division (13. Landwehr-Division) was a unit of the Imperial German Army in World War I.
