= Waffle =

Batter- or dough-based food

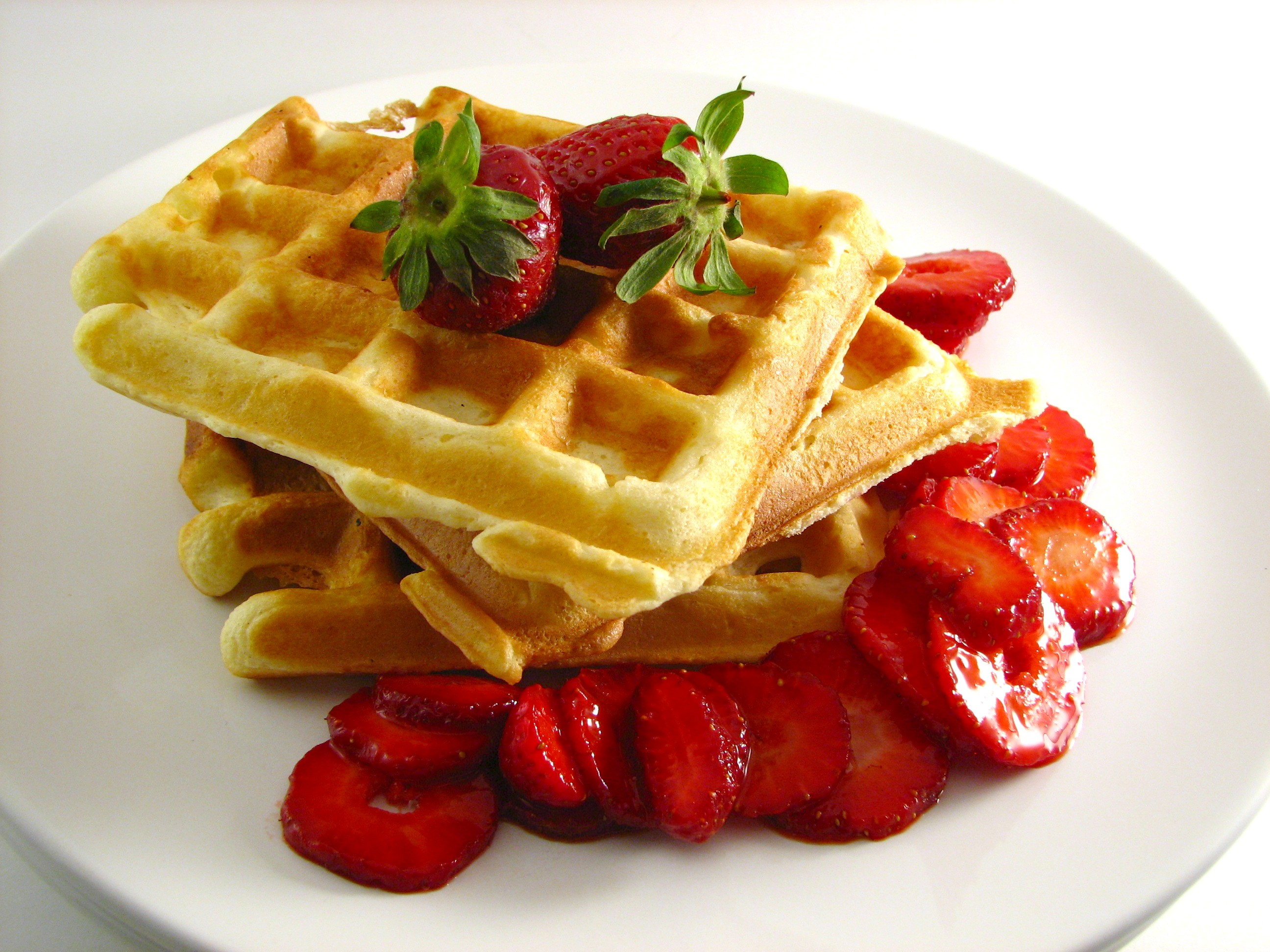
- Waffles with strawberry topping
- Place of origin: Belgium, France
- Region or state: Western Europe
- Main ingredients: Batter or dough
- Variations: Liège waffle, Brussels waffle, Flemish waffle, Bergische waffle, stroopwafel, and others

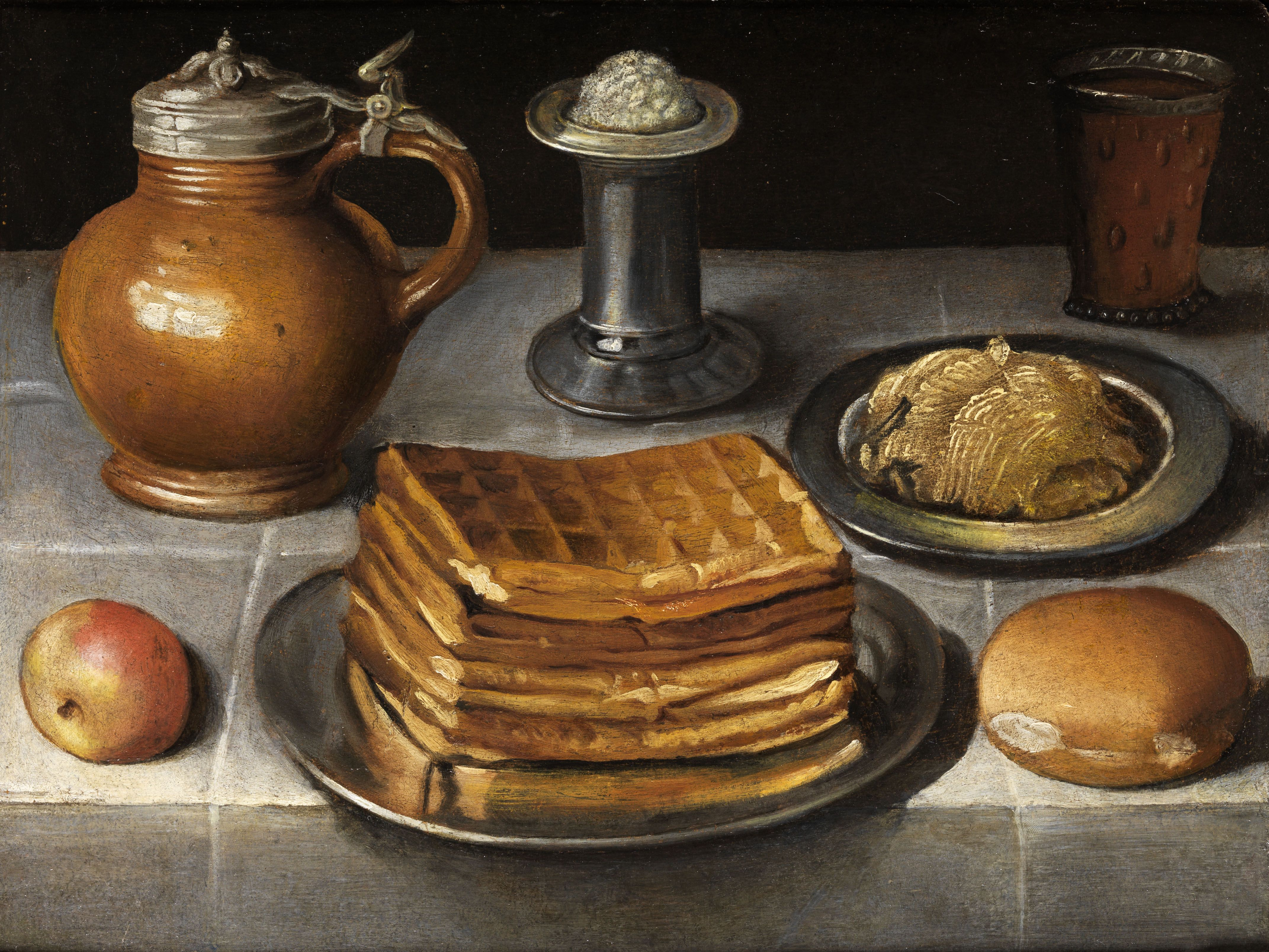
Still life with waffles, 17th century

A waffle is a dish made from usually leavened batter or dough that is cooked between two plates that are patterned to give a characteristic size, shape, and surface impression. There are many variations based on the type of waffle iron and recipe used. Waffles are eaten throughout the world, particularly in Belgium, which has over a dozen regional varieties. Waffles may be made fresh or simply heated after having been commercially baked and packaged fresh or frozen.

== Etymology ==
The word waffle first appears in the English language in 1725: "Waffles. Take flower, cream...." It is directly derived from the Dutch wafel, which itself derives from the Middle Dutch wafele.

While the Middle Dutch wafele is first attested at the end of the 13th century, it is preceded by the French walfre in 1185. Both are from the Frankish word wafla ("honeycomb" or "cake").

Other spellings throughout modern and medieval Europe include waffe, wafre, wafer, wâfel, waufre, iauffe, gaufre, goffre, gauffre, wafe, waffel, wåfe, wāfel, wafe, vaffel, and våffla.

== History ==
=== Medieval origins ===
In ancient times, the Greeks cooked flat cakes, called obelios, between hot metal plates. As they spread throughout medieval Europe, the cakes—made from a mixture of flour, water or milk, and often eggs—became known as wafers and were also cooked over an open fire between iron plates with long handles.

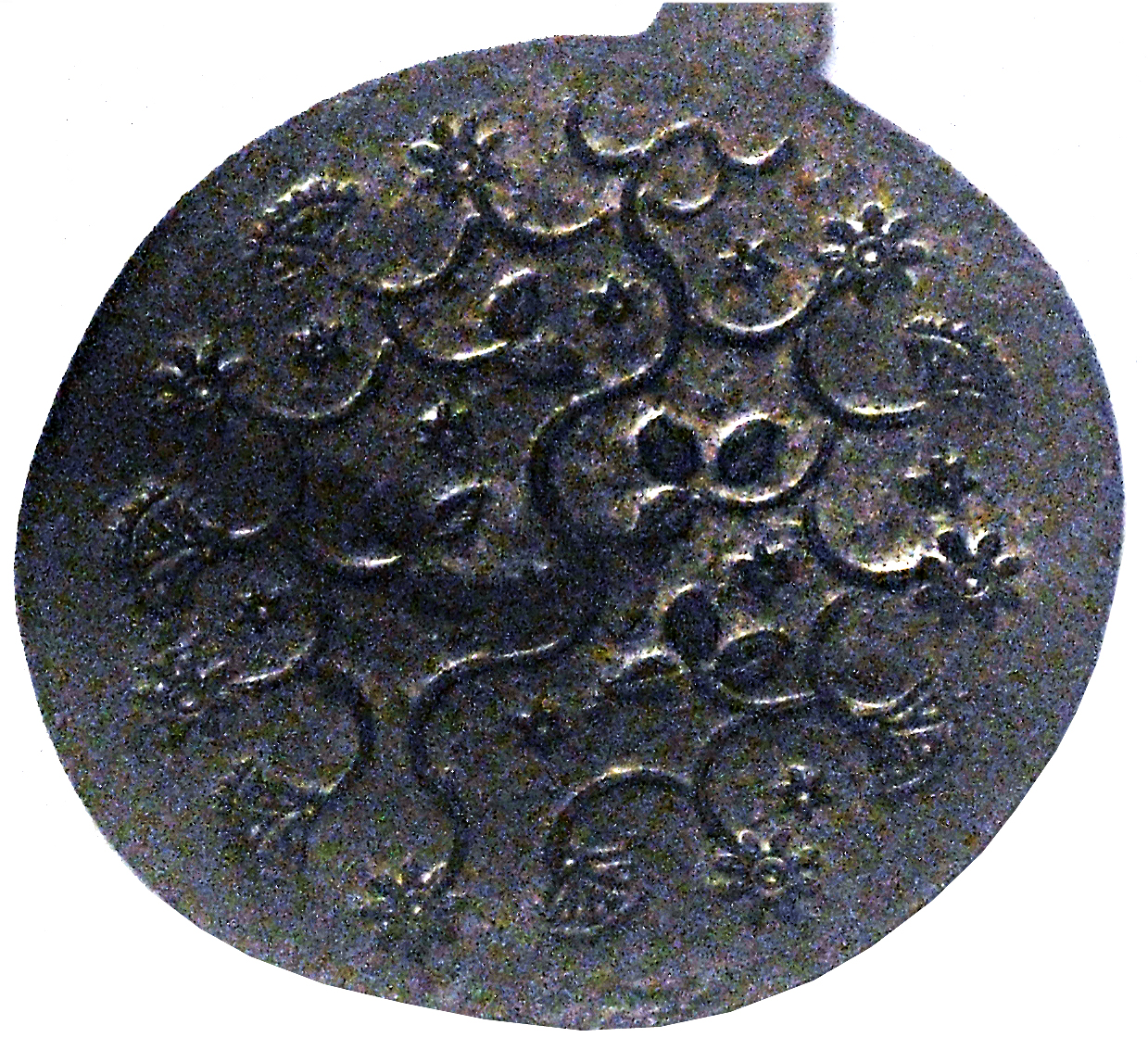
Detail of a Belgian moule à oublie

Waffles are preceded, in the early Middle Ages, around the period of the 9th–10th centuries, with the simultaneous emergence of fer à hosties / hostieijzers (communion wafer irons) and moule à oublies (wafer irons). While the communion wafer irons typically depicted imagery of Jesus and his crucifixion, the moule à oublies featured more trivial Biblical scenes or simple, emblematic designs. The format of the iron itself was almost always round and considerably larger than those used for communion.

The oublie was, in its basic form, composed only of grain flour and water—just as the communion wafer was. It took until the 11th century, when the Crusades brought new culinary ingredients to Western Europe, for flavorings such as orange blossom water to be added to oublies; however, locally sourced honey and other flavorings may have already been in use before that time.

Oublies (which formally received this name c. 1200) spread throughout northwestern continental Europe. Their spread eventually led to the formation of the oublieurs guild in 1270. Oublieurs/obloyers were responsible for producing not only oublies but also a number of other contemporaneous and subsequent pâtisseries légères (light pastries), including the waffles that were soon to arise.

=== 14th–16th centuries ===
In the late 14th century, the first known waffle recipe was penned in an anonymous manuscript, Le Ménagier de Paris, written by a husband as a set of instructions to his young wife. While it technically contains four recipes, all are a variation of the first: Beat some eggs in a bowl, season with salt and add wine. Toss in some flour, and mix. Then fill, little by little, two irons at a time with as much of the paste as a slice of cheese is large. Then close the iron and cook both sides. If the dough does not detach easily from the iron, coat it first with a piece of cloth that has been soaked in oil or grease. The other three variations explain how cheese is to be placed between two layers of batter, grated and mixed into the batter, or left out, along with the eggs. However, this was a waffle / gaufre in name only, as the recipe contained no leavening.

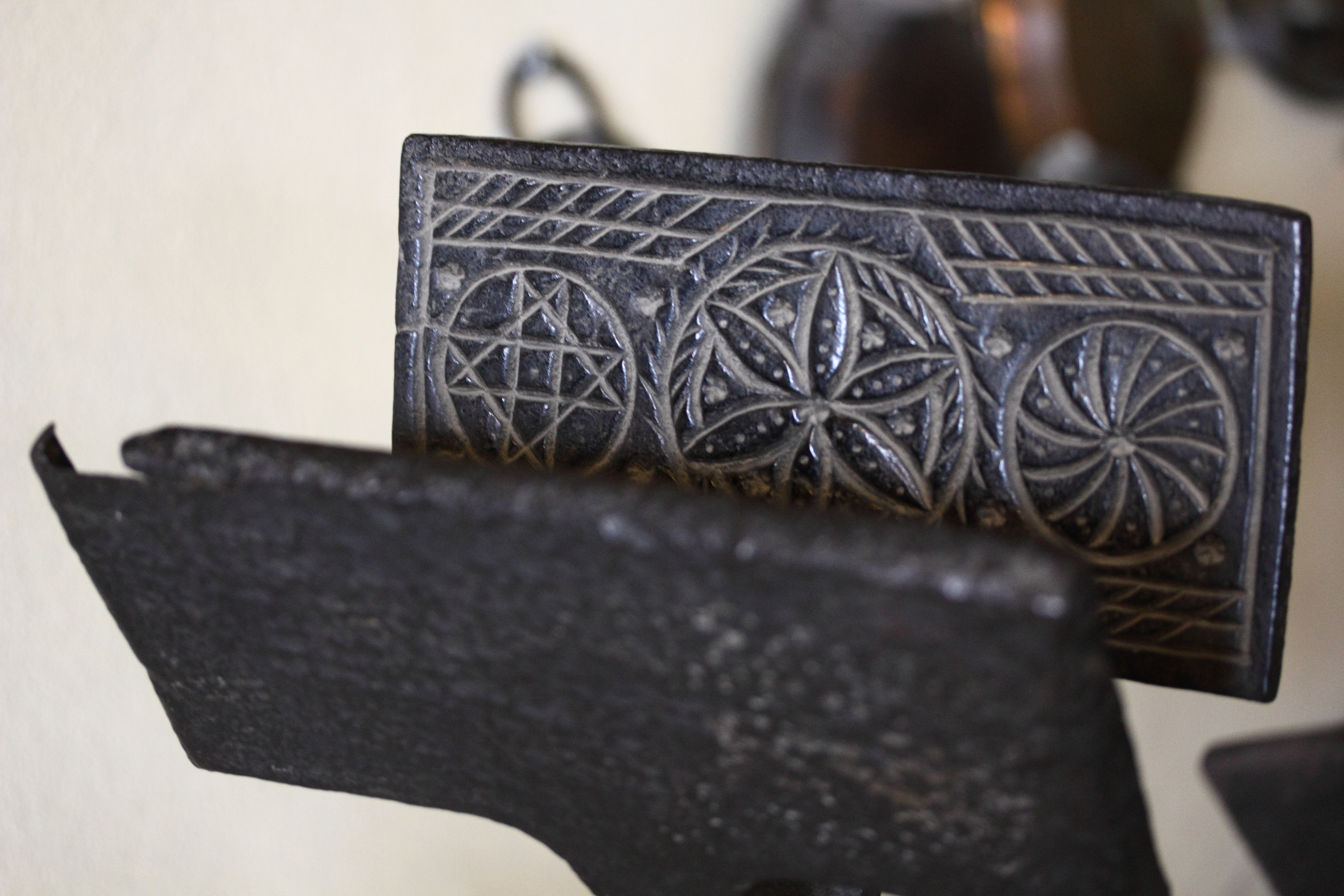
Detail of a French moule à oublie / moule à gaufre, Musée Lorrain

Though some have speculated that waffle irons first appeared in the 13th–14th centuries, it was not until the 15th century that a true physical distinction between the oublie and the waffle began to evolve. Notably, while a recipe like the fourth in Le Ménagier de Paris was only flour, salt, and wine—indistinguishable from common oublie recipes of the time—what emerged was a new shape to many of the irons being produced. Not only were the newly fashioned ones rectangular, taking the form of the fer à hosties, but some circular oublie irons were cut down to create rectangles. It was also in this period that the waffle's classic grid motif appeared clearly in a French fer à oublie and a Belgian wafelijzer—albeit in a more shallowly engraved fashion—setting the stage for the more deeply gridded irons that were about to become commonplace throughout Belgium.

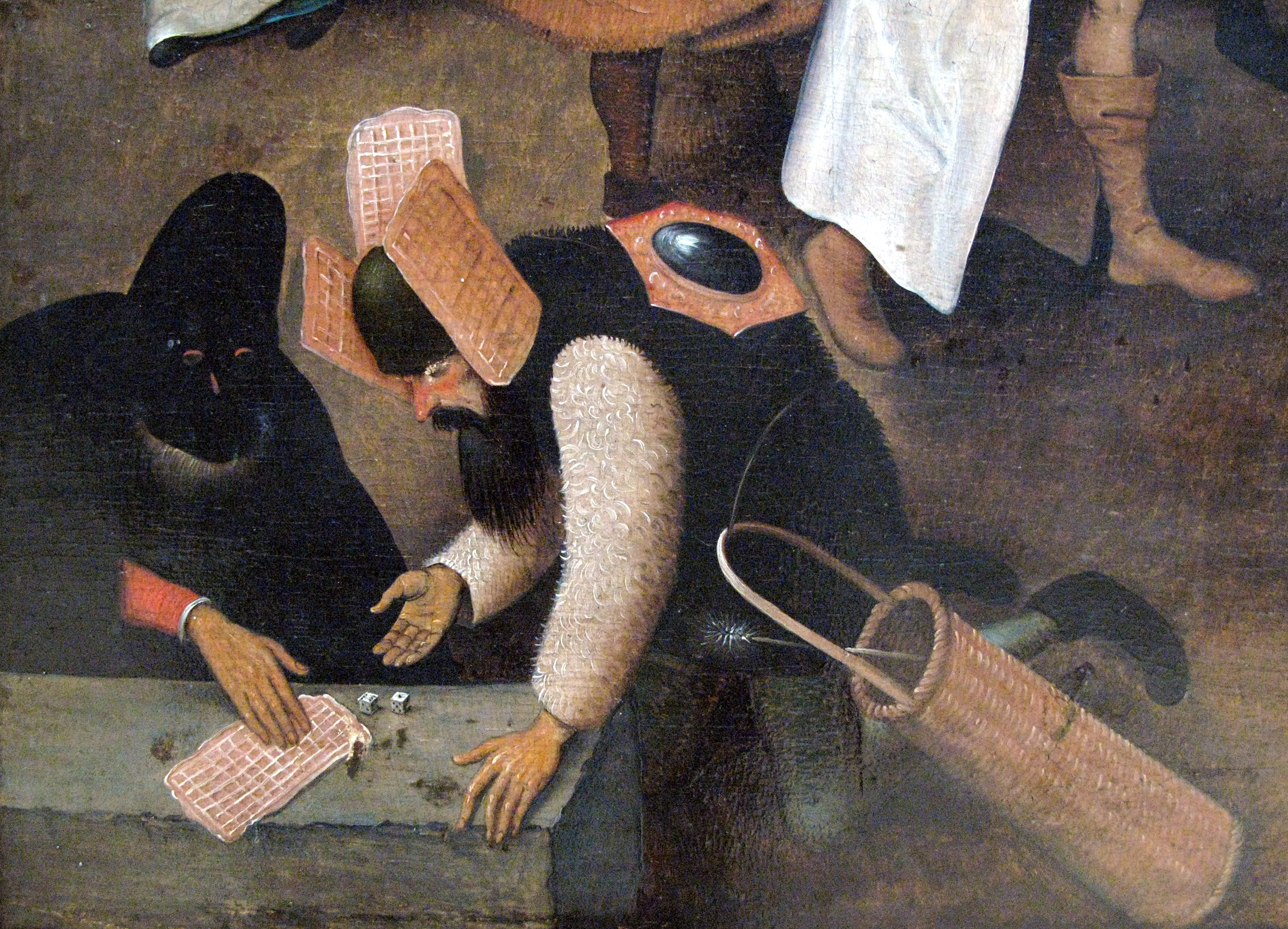
Detail from Pieter Bruegel's Het gevecht tussen Carnaval en Vasten – among the first known images of waffles

By the 16th century, paintings by Joachim de Beuckelaer, Pieter Aertsen and Pieter Bruegel clearly depict the modern waffle form. Bruegel's work, in particular, not only shows waffles being cooked, but fine detail of individual waffles. In those instances, the waffle pattern can be counted as a large 12x7 grid, with cleanly squared sides, suggesting the use of a fairly thin batter, akin to contemporary Brussels waffles (Brusselse wafels).

The earliest of the 16th century waffle recipes, Om ghode waffellen te backen—from the Dutch KANTL 15 manuscript (c. 1500–1560)—is only the second-known waffle recipe after the four variants described in Le Ménagier de Paris. For the first time, partial measurements were given, sugar was used, and spices were added directly to the batter: Take grated white bread. Take with that the yolk of an egg and a spoonful of pot sugar or powdered sugar. Take with that half water and half wine, and ginger and cinnamon.

Alternately attributed to the 16th and 17th centuries, Groote Wafelen from the Belgian Een Antwerps kookboek was published as the first recipe to use leavening (beer yeast): Take white flour, warm cream, fresh melted butter, yeast, and mix together until the flour is no longer visible. Then add ten or twelve egg yolks. Those who do not want them to be too expensive may also add the egg white and just milk. Put the resulting dough at the fireplace for four hours to let it rise better before baking it. Until this time, no recipes contained leavening, and dough could therefore be easily cooked in the thin moule à oublies. Groote Wafelen, in its use of leavening, was the genesis of contemporary waffles and validates the use of deeper irons (wafelijzers) depicted in the Beuckelaer and Bruegel paintings of the time.

Charles IX, King of France, created the first legislation regulating waffle sales.

By the mid-16th century, there were signs of waffles' mounting French popularity. François I, king from 1494 to 1547, who, it was said, les aimait beacoup (loved them a lot), had a set of waffle irons cast in pure silver. His successor, Charles IX enacted the first waffle legislation in 1560 in response to a series of quarrels and fights that had been breaking out between oublieurs. As a result of the legislation, oublieurs were required "d'être au moins à la distance de deux toises l'un de l'autre." (to be no less than four yards from one to the other).

=== 17th–18th centuries ===
By the 17th century, unsweetened or honey-sweetened waffles and oublies—often made of non-wheat grains—were the type generally accessible to the average citizen. The wheat-based and particularly the sugar-sweetened varieties, while present throughout Europe, were prohibitively expensive for all but the monarchy and bourgeoisie. Even for the Dutch, who controlled much of the mid-century sugar trade, a kilogram of sugar was worth half an ounce of silver (the equivalent of ~$7 for a 5 lb. bag, 01/2016 spot silver prices), while, elsewhere in Europe, it fetched twice the price of opium. Wealthier families' waffles, often known as mestiers, were "smaller, thinner and above all more delicate, being composed of egg yolks, sugar, and the finest of the finest flour, mixed in white wine" and were served "like dessert pastry."

By the dawn of the 18th century, expansion of Caribbean plantations had cut sugar prices in half. Waffle recipes abounded and became decadent in their use of sugar and other rare ingredients. For instance, Menon's gaufre from Nouveau Traité de la Cuisine included a livre of sugar for a demi-livre of flour.

Germany became a leader in the development and publication of waffle recipes during the 18th century, introducing coffee waffles, the specific use of Hefeweizen beer yeast, cardamom, nutmeg, and a number of Zuickerwaffeln (sugar waffles). At the same time, the French introduced whipped egg whites to waffles, along with lemon zests, Spanish wine, and cloves. Joseph Gillier even published the first chocolate waffle recipe, featuring three ounces of chocolate grated and mixed into the batter, before cooking.

A number of 18th-century waffle recipes took on names to designate their country or region/city of origin—Schwedische Waffeln, Gauffres à l'Allemande and, most famous of all the 18th century varieties, Gauffres à la Flamande, which were first recorded in 1740. These Gauffres à la Flamande (Flemish waffles / Gaufres de Lille) were the first French recipe to use beer yeast, but unlike the Dutch and German yeasted recipes that preceded them, use only egg whites and over a pound of butter in each batch. They are also the oldest named recipe that survives in popular use to the present day, produced regionally and commercially by Meert.

The 18th century is also when the word waffle first appeared in the English language, in a 1725 printing of Court Cookery by Robert Smith. Recipes had begun to spread throughout England and America, though essentially all were patterned after established Dutch, Belgian, German, and French versions. Waffle parties, known as "wafel frolics", were documented as early as 1744 in New Jersey, and the Dutch had earlier established waffles in New Amsterdam (New York City).

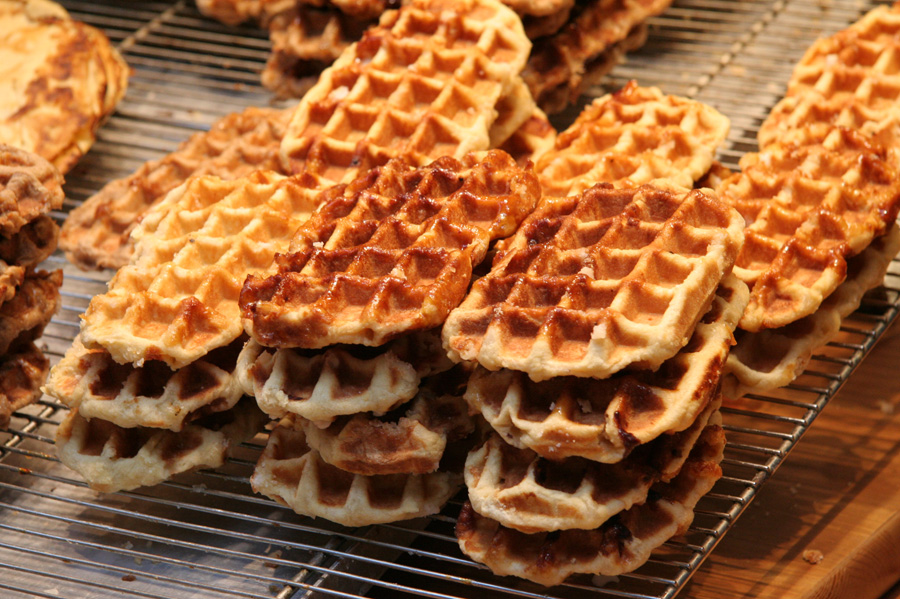
Liège waffles—supposedly created by an 18th-century chef for the prince-bishop of Liège—did not emerge until 1921.

Liège waffles, the most popular contemporary Belgian waffle variety, are supposed to have been invented during the 18th century as well, by the chef to the prince-bishop of Liège. However, there are no German, French, Dutch, or Belgian cookbooks that contain references to them in this period by any name, nor are there any waffle recipes that mention the Liège waffle's distinctive ingredients, brioche-based dough and pearl sugar. It is not until 1814 that Antoine Beauvilliers publishes a recipe in l'Art du Cuisiner where brioche dough is introduced as the base of the waffle and sucre cassé (crushed block sugar) is used as a garnish for the waffles, though not worked into the dough. Antonin Carême, the famous Parisian pastry chef, is the first to incorporate gros sucre into several waffle variations named in his 1822 work, Le Maitre d'Hotel Français. Then, in 1834, Leblanc publishes a complete recipe for gaufres grêlées (hail waffles), where gros sucre is mixed in. A full Gaufre de Liège recipe does not appear until 1921.

=== 19th–21st centuries ===
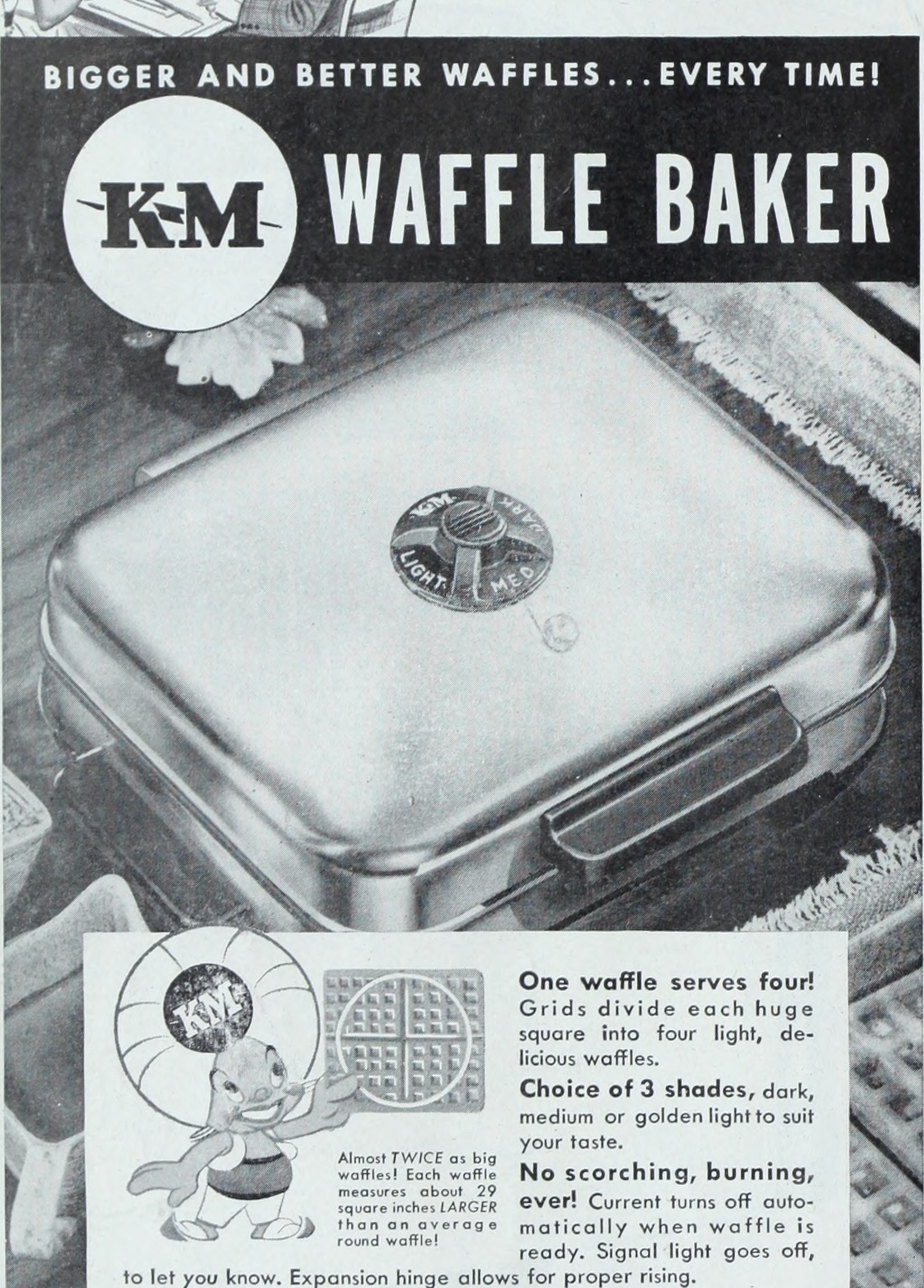
1948 advertisement for a "Waffle baker" inside the Ladies Home Journal

Waffles remained widely popular in Europe for the first half of the 19th century, despite the 1806 British Atlantic naval blockade that greatly inflated the price of sugar. This coincided with the commercial production of beet sugar in continental Europe, which, in a matter of decades, had brought the price down to historical lows. Within the transitional period from cane to beet sugar, Florian Dacher formalized a recipe for the Brussels Waffle, the predecessor to American "Belgian" waffles, recording the recipe in 1842/43. Stroopwafels (Dutch syrup wafels), too, rose to prominence in the Netherlands by the middle of the century. However, by the second half of the 1800s, inexpensive beet sugar became widely available, and a wide range of pastries, candies and chocolates were now accessible to the middle class, as never before; waffles' popularity declined rapidly.

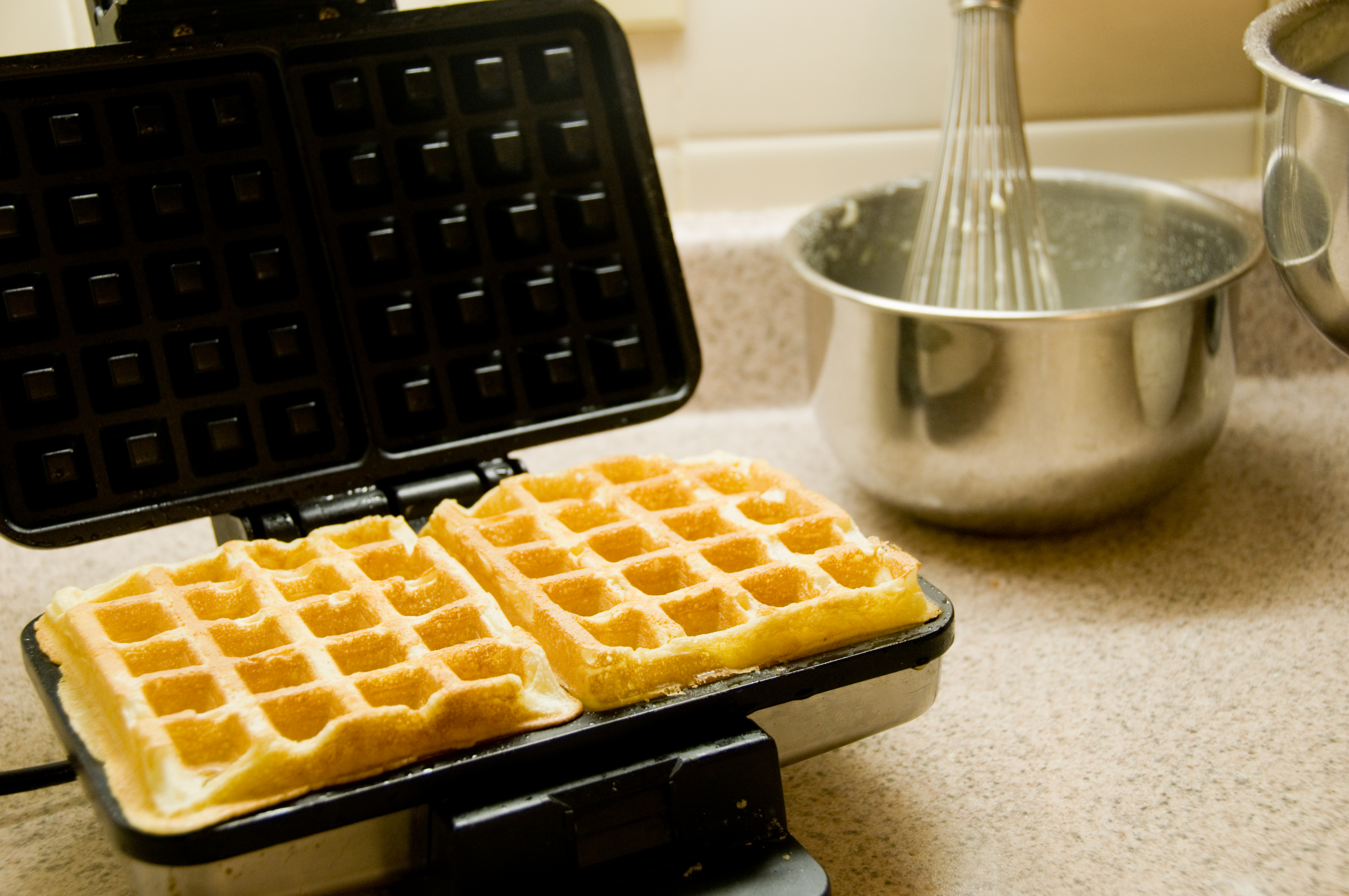
A modern waffle iron

By the early 20th century, waffle recipes became rare in recipe books, and only 29 professional waffle craftsmen, the oublieurs, remained in Paris. Waffles were shifting from a predominantly street-vendor-based product to an increasingly homemade product, aided by the 1918 introduction of the US company General Electric's first electric commercial waffle maker. By the mid-1930s, dry pancake/waffle mix had been marketed by a number of companies, including Aunt Jemima, Bisquick, and a team of three brothers, the Dorsas from San Jose, California, United States. It is the Dorsas who would go on to innovate commercial production of frozen waffles, which they began selling under the name "Eggo" in 1953. Manufacturers are now testing the production of waffles with potato starch, which increase the stability of the waffle and protect them from sticking to the iron. Belgian-style waffles were showcased at Expo 58 in Brussels. Another Belgian introduced Belgian-style waffles to the United States at the 1962 Seattle World's Fair, but only really took hold at the 1964 New York World's Fair, when another Belgian entrepreneur introduced his "Bel-Gem" waffles. In practice, contemporary American "Belgian waffles" are actually a hybrid of pre-existing American waffle types and ingredients and some attributes of the Belgian model.

Even as most of the original recipes have faded from use, a number of the 18th- and 19th-century varieties can still be easily found throughout Northern Europe, where they were first developed.

== Varieties ==
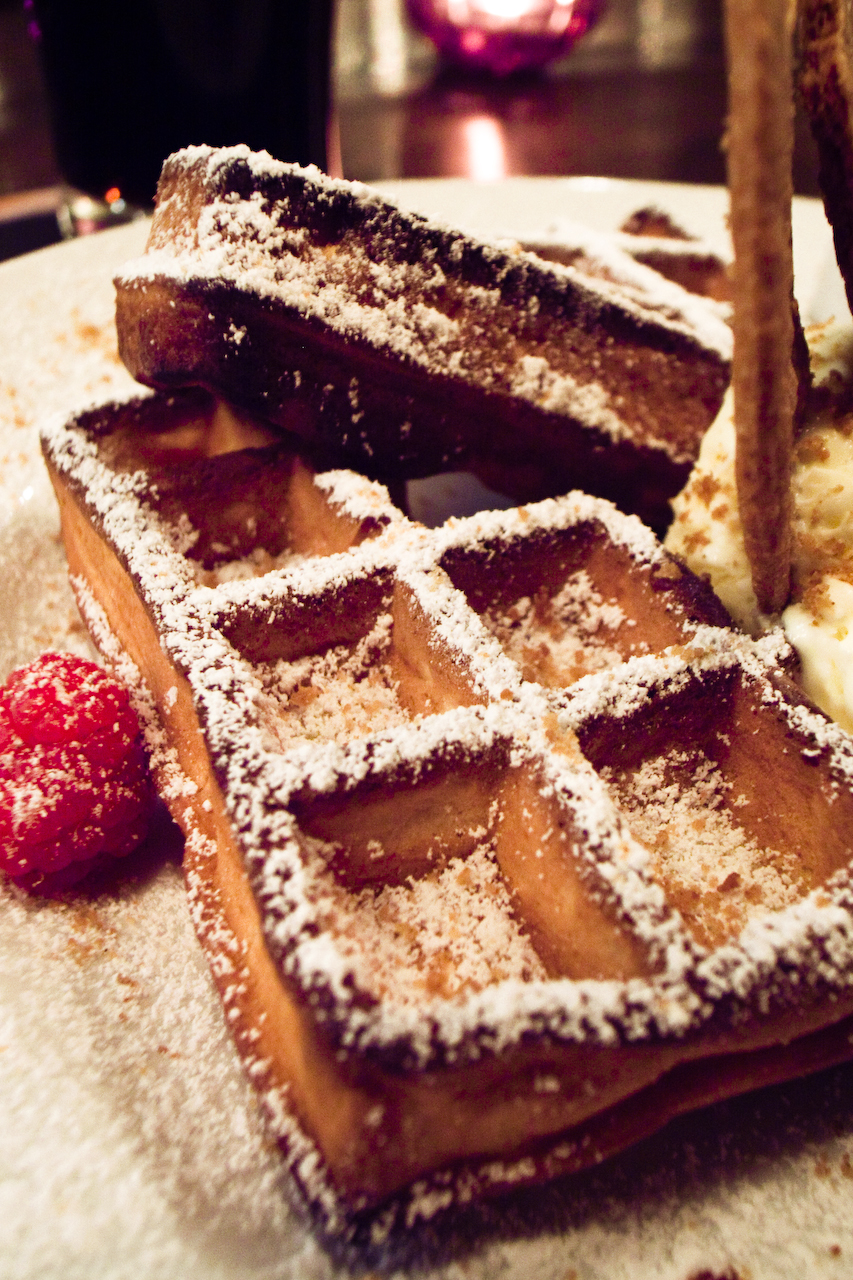
Brussels waffle

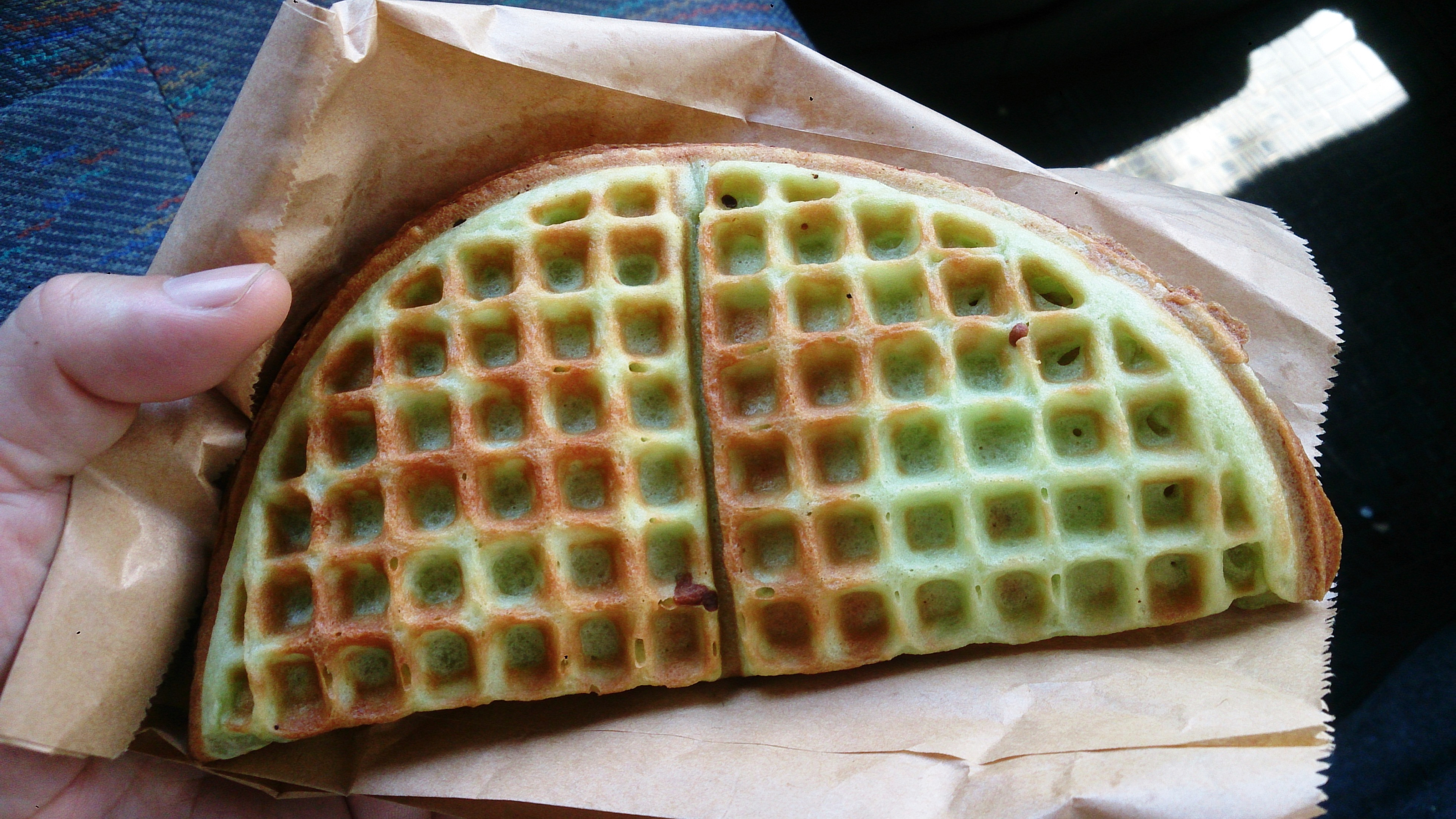
Plain waffle with pandan batter sold at a neighborhood store in Singapore.

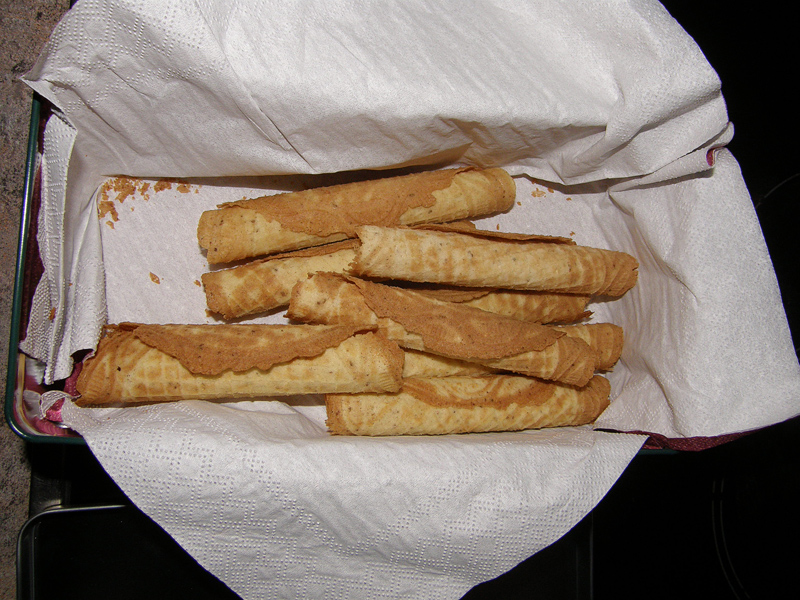
Rolled waffles

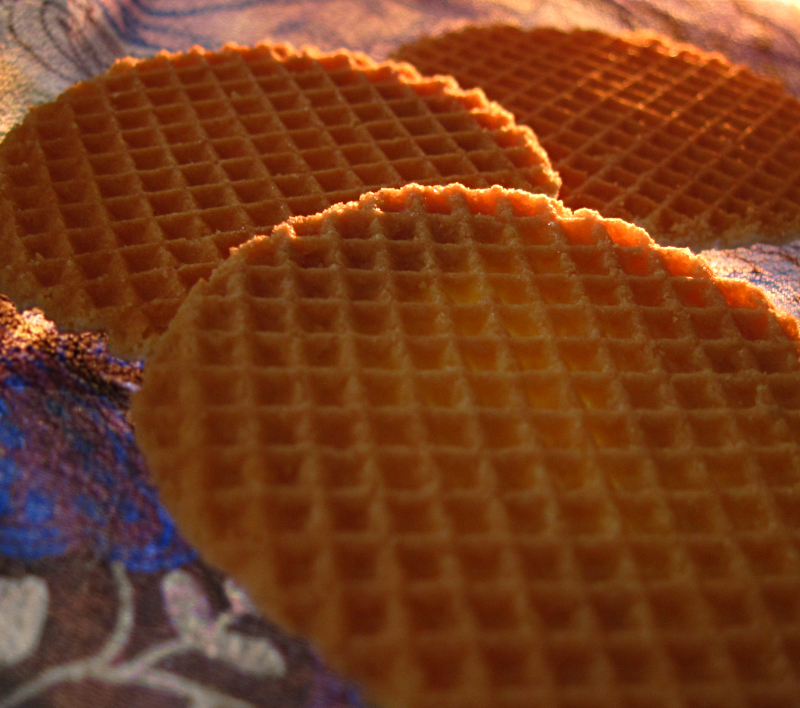
Waffle cookies made in Belgium and imported to the United States.

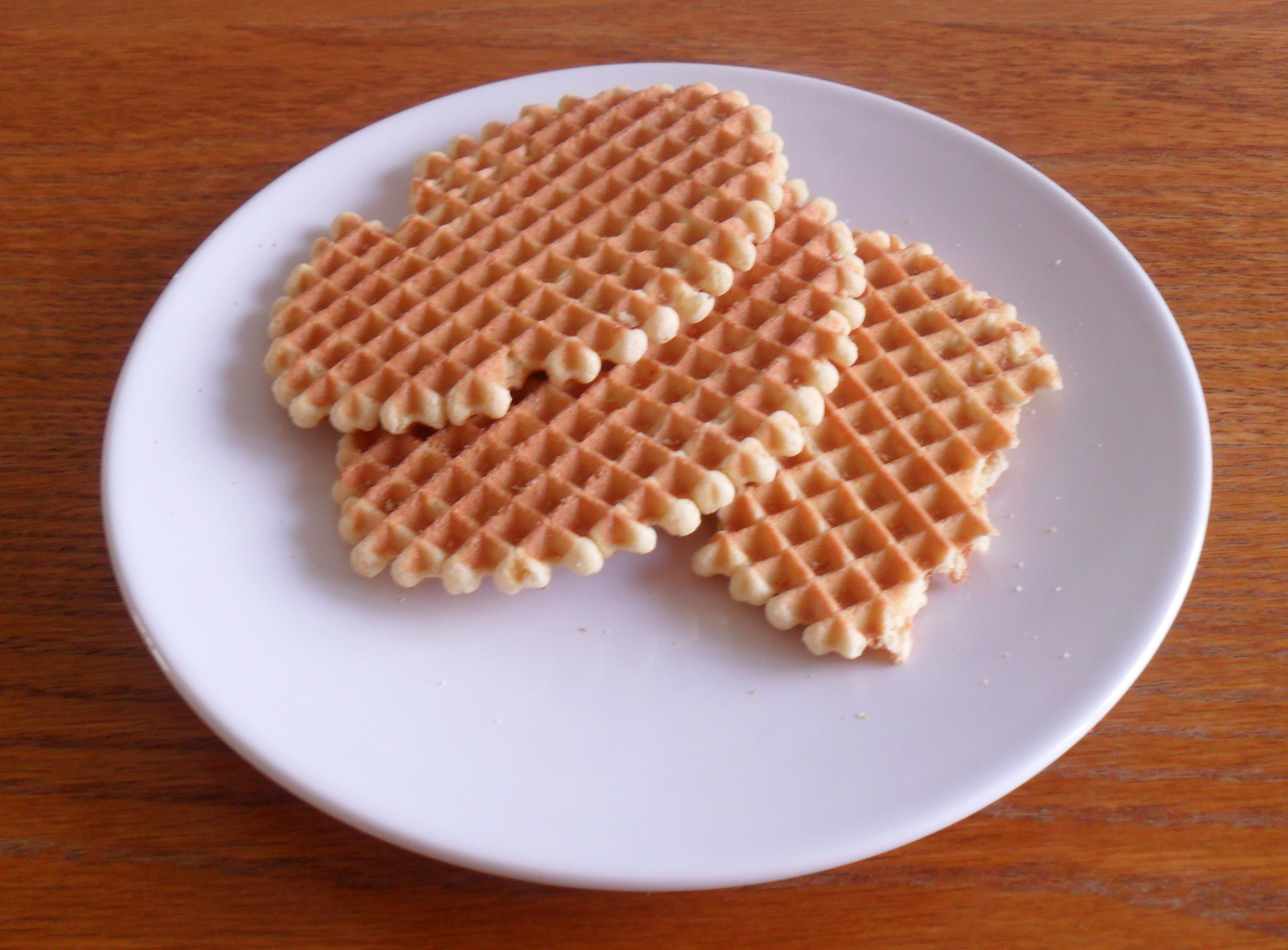
Galettes campinoises

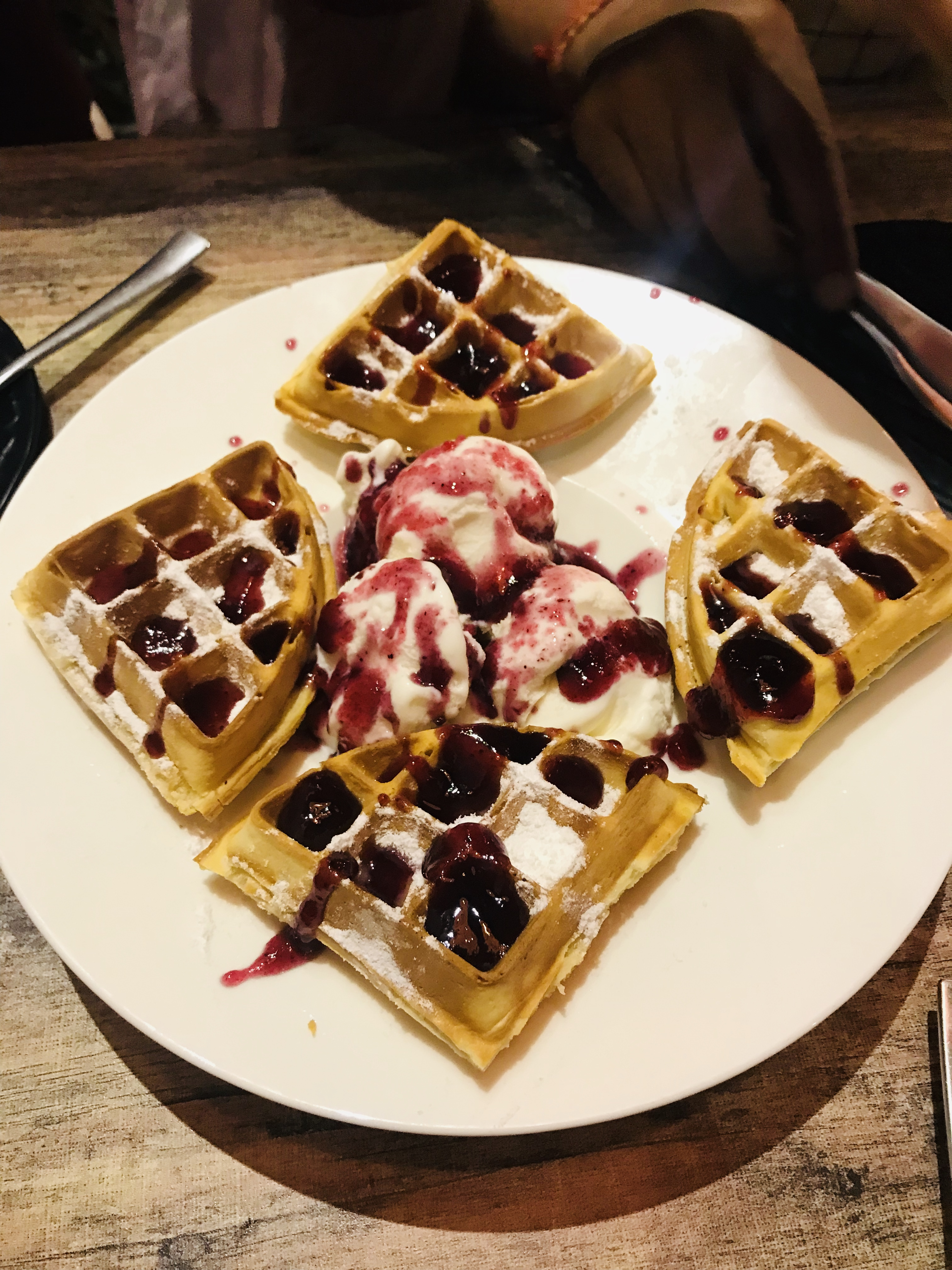
Waffle with ice cream

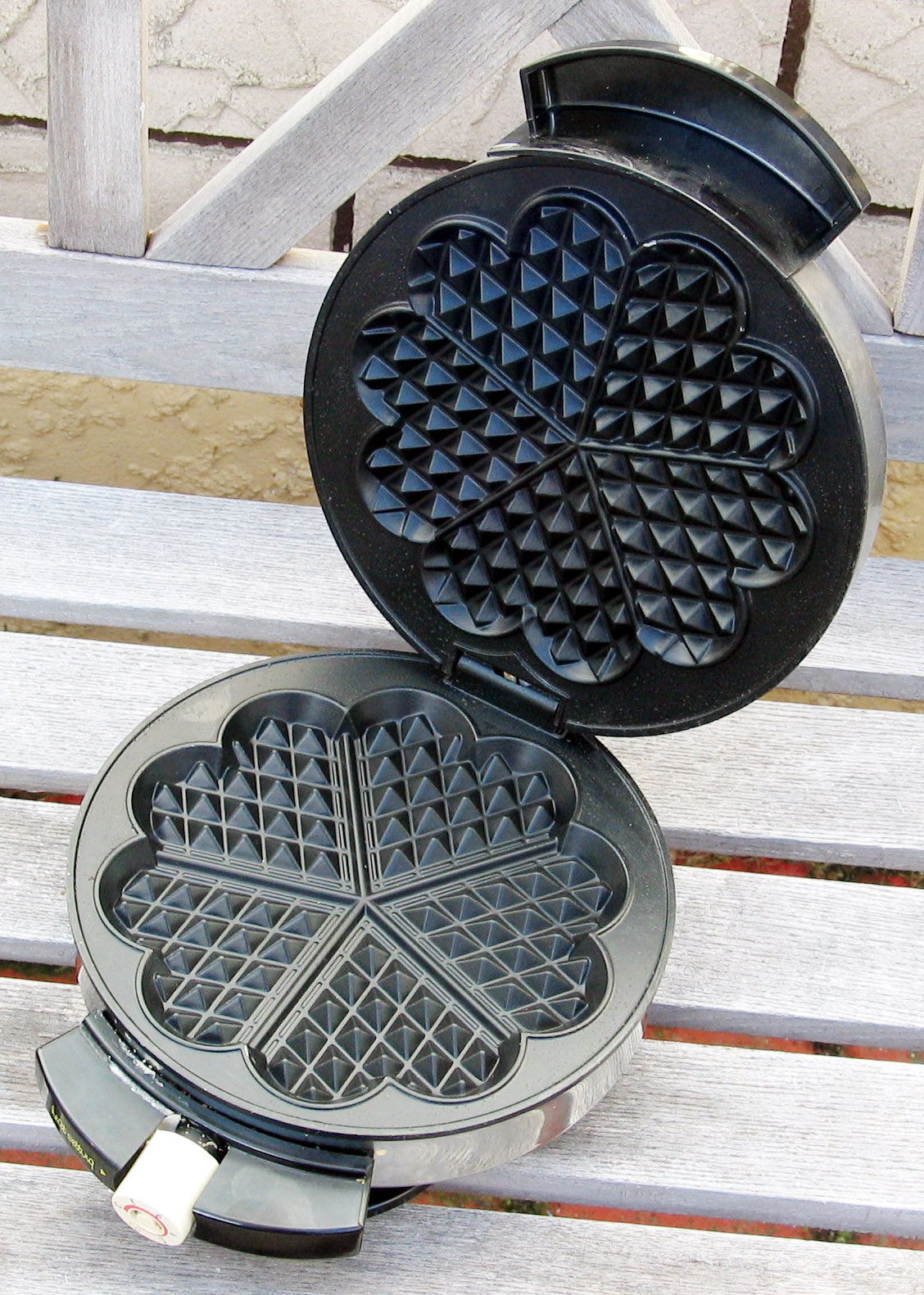
A Norwegian waffle iron, producing the characteristic heart-shaped waffles.

=== Brussels ===
Brussels waffles are prepared with an egg-white-leavened or yeast-leavened batter, traditionally an ale yeast; occasionally both types of leavening are used together. They are lighter, crisper and have larger pockets compared to other European waffle varieties, and are easy to differentiate from Liège waffles by their rectangular sides. In Belgium, most waffles are served warm by street vendors and dusted with confectioner's sugar, though in tourist areas they might be topped with whipped cream, soft fruit or chocolate spread.

Variants of the Brussels waffles – with whipped and folded egg whites cooked in large rectangular forms – date from the 18th century. However, the oldest recognized reference to "Gaufres de Bruxelles" (Brussels Waffles) by name is attributed from 1842/43 to Florian Dacher, a Swiss baker in Ghent, Belgium, who had previously worked under pastry chefs in central Brussels. Philippe Édouard Cauderlier would later publish Dacher's recipe in the 1874 edition of his recipe book "La Pâtisserie et la Confiture". Maximilien Consael, another Ghent chef, had claimed to have invented the waffles in 1839, though there's no written record of him either naming or selling the waffles until his participation in the 1856 Brussels Fair. Neither man created the recipe; they simply popularized and formalized an existing recipe as the Brussels waffle.

=== Liège ===
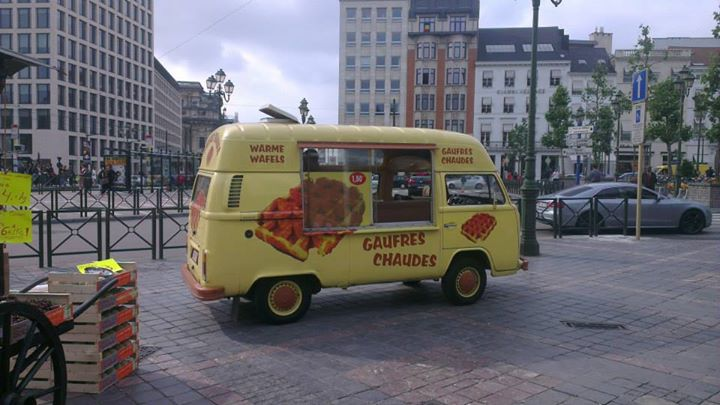
A food van selling waffles in Brussels

The Liège waffle is a richer, denser, sweeter, and chewier waffle. Native to the greater Wallonia region of Eastern Belgium – and alternately known as gaufres de chasse (hunting waffles) – they are an adaptation of brioche bread dough, featuring chunks of pearl sugar which caramelize on the outside of the waffle when baked. It is the most common type of waffle available in Belgium and prepared in plain, vanilla and cinnamon varieties by street vendors across the nation.

=== Flemish ===
Flemish waffles, or Gaufres à la Flamande, are a specialty of northern France and portions of western Belgium. The original recipe, published in 1740 by Louis-Auguste de Bourbon in Le Cuisinier Gascon, is as follows: Take "deux litrons" (1.7 liters or 7 cups) of flour and mix it in a bowl with salt and one ounce of brewer's yeast barm. Moisten it completely with warm milk. Then whisk fifteen egg whites and add that to the mixture, stirring continuously. Incorporate "un livre" (490 grams or 1.1 pounds) of fresh butter, and let the batter rise. Once the batter has risen, take your heated iron, made expressly for these waffles, and wrap some butter in a cloth and rub both sides of the iron with it. When the iron is completely heated, make your waffles, but do so gently for fear of burning them. Cooked, take them out, put them on a platter, and serve them with both sugar and orange blossom water on top.

=== American ===
American waffles vary significantly. Generally denser and thinner than the Belgian waffle, they are often made from a batter leavened with baking powder, which is sometimes mixed with pecans, chocolate chips or berries and may be round, square, or rectangular in shape. Like American pancakes they are usually served as a sweet breakfast food, topped with butter and maple syrup, bacon, and other fruit syrups, honey, or powdered sugar. They are also found in many different savory dishes, such as fried chicken and waffles or topped with kidney stew. They may also be served as desserts, topped with ice cream and various other toppings. A large chain (over 1,900 locations) of waffle specialty diners, Waffle House, is ubiquitous in the southern United States.

=== Belgian ===
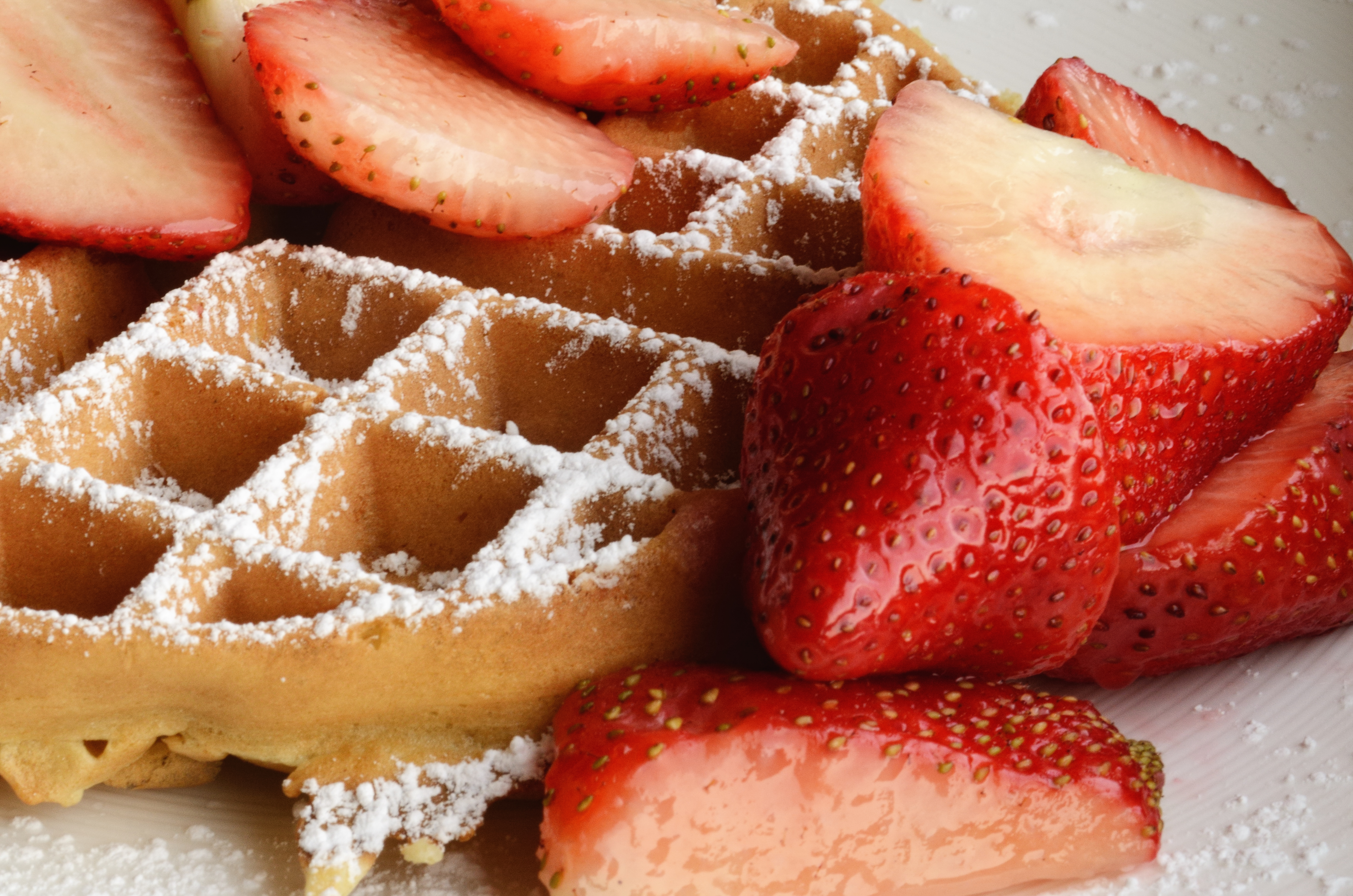
The "Belgian" waffle is popular in North America.

Belgian waffles are based on a simplified version of the Brussels waffle. Recipes are typically baking soda leavened, though some are yeast-raised. They are distinguished from standard American waffles by their use of 1 ½" depth irons. Belgian waffles take their name from the Bel-Gem brand, which was promoted by waffle vendor Maurice Vermersch, who came from Brussels, Belgium. The thicker style was also popularized at the 1964 New York World's Fair.

=== Bergische ===
Bergische waffles, or Waffles from Berg county, are a specialty of the German region of Bergisches Land. The waffles are crisp and less dense than Belgian waffles, always heart shaped, and served with cherries, cream and optionally rice pudding as part of the traditional afternoon feast on Sundays in the region.

=== Hong Kong ===
Hong Kong style waffle, in Hong Kong called a "grid cake" or "grid biscuits" (格仔餅), is a waffle usually made and sold by street hawkers and eaten warm on the street. It is similar to a traditional waffle but larger, round in shape and divided into four quarters. It is usually served as a snack. Butter, peanut butter and sugar are spread on one side of the cooked waffle, and then it is folded into a semicircle to eat. Eggs, sugar and evaporated milk are used in the waffle recipes, giving them a sweet flavor. They are generally soft and not dense. Traditional Hong Kong style waffles are full of the flavor of yolk. Sometimes different flavors, such as chocolate and honey melon, are used in the recipe and create various colors. Another style of Hong Kong waffle is the eggette or gai daan jai (鷄蛋仔), which have a ball-shaped pattern.

=== Pandan ===
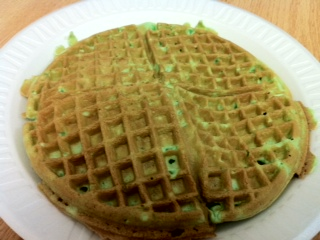
Pandan waffle

Pandan waffles originate from Vietnam and are characterized by the use of pandan flavoring and coconut milk in the batter. The pandan flavoring results in the batter's distinctive spring green color. When cooked, the waffle browns and crisps on the outside and stays green and chewy on the inside. Unlike most waffles, pandan waffles are typically eaten plain. In Vietnam they are relatively cheap and so are popular among children. They are a popular street food made in either cast iron molds heated with charcoal or in electric waffle irons.

=== Croffle ===
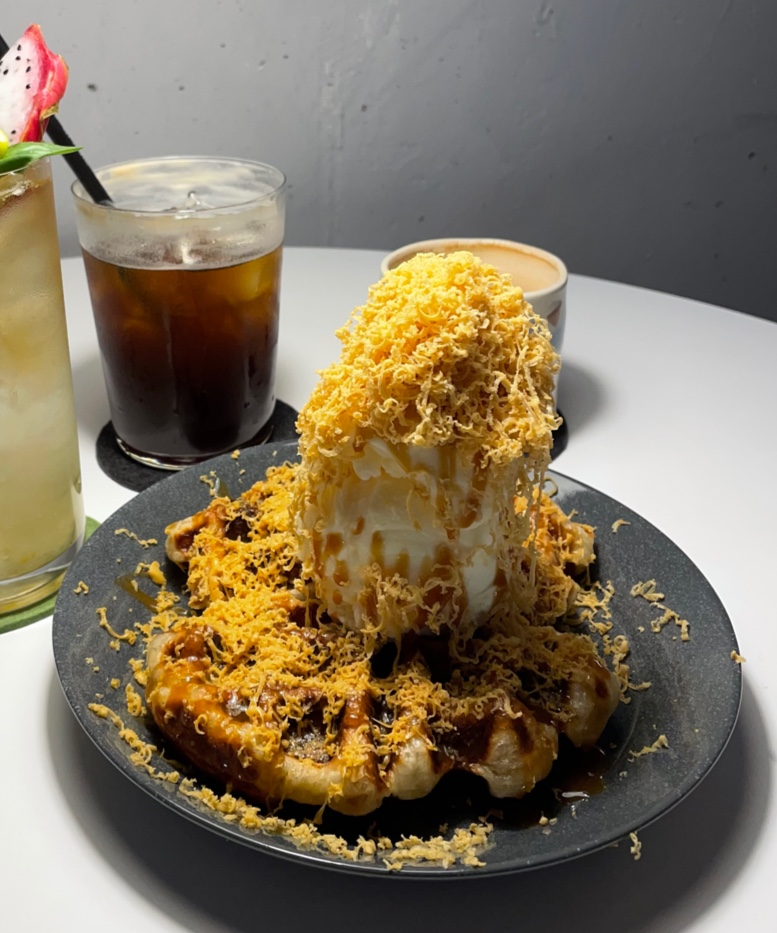
Croffle with ice cream

Croffle (a compound word of croissant and waffle) bakes croissant dough in a waffle pan and eaten with ice cream or maple syrup. It is a popular dessert in Korea. On the Internet, jokes about "the greatest invention of the COVID-19 Age" spread. There are various types of croffles that utilize various toppings such as basil, corn, cheese and so on. It is also popular with people because it is easy to make and eat at home. The beginning of Croffle is the cafe "Le Petit Parisian" in Dublin, Ireland. According to the Irish newspaper Dublin Gadget (reported on July 20, 2017), Louise Lenox, a baker at the café in Camden Street, Dublin, first created a menu item called Croffle.

=== Kue gapit ===
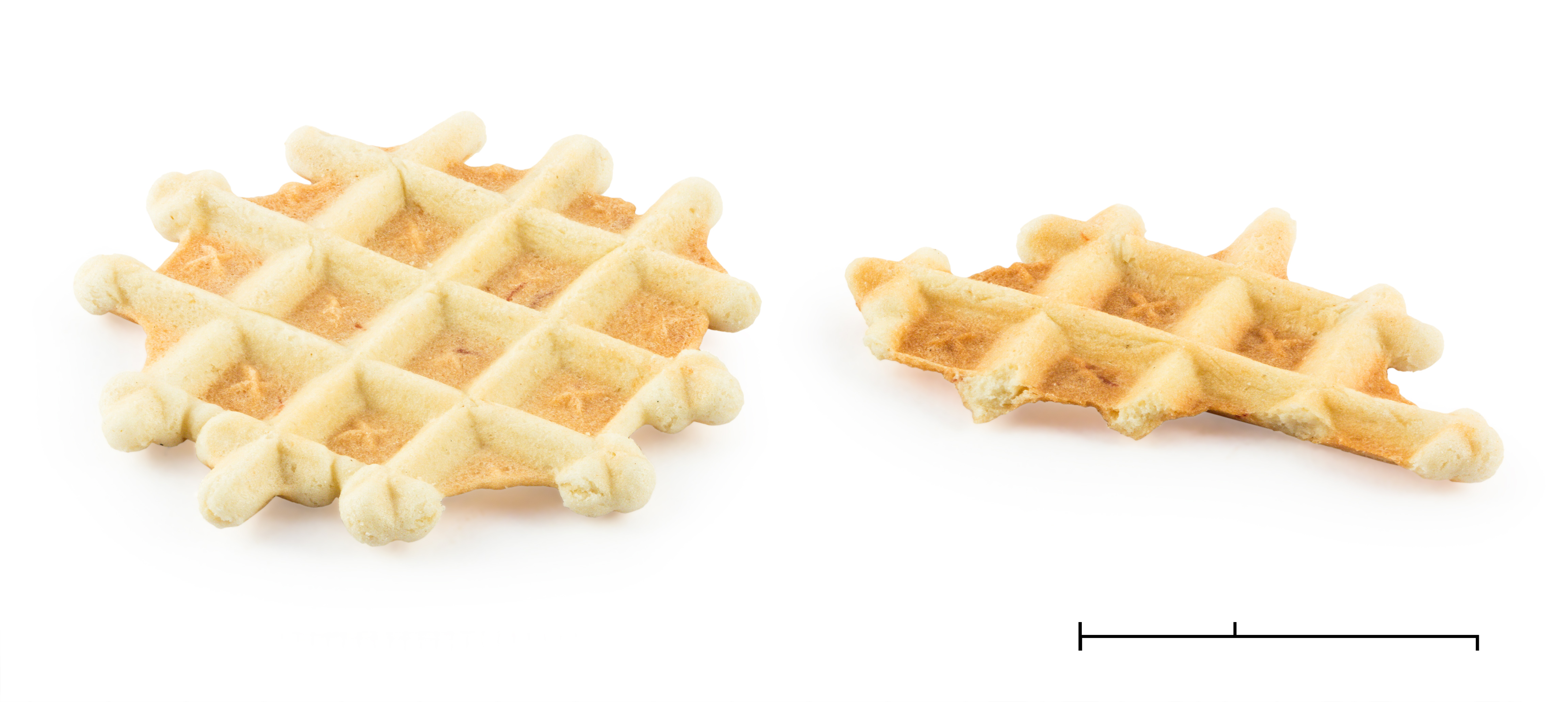
Kue gapit is popular in Indonesia.

Kue gapit is an Indonesian kue kering (dry snack) which originates from West Java. Generally made from tapioca flour, its name comes from the cooking process, in which it is grilled between iron molds like a waffle. The snack comes in a variety of shapes and flavors.

=== Scandinavian ===
Scandinavian style waffles, common throughout the Nordic countries, are thin and made in a round waffle iron. The batter is similar to other varieties, but does not contain sugar. The most common style are heart-shaped slices with a sweet topping such as cream or jam.

- In Norway, brunost and gomme are also popular toppings. As with crèpes, there are those who prefer a salted style with various mixes, such as blue cheese.
- In Finland, savory toppings are uncommon; instead jam, sugar, whipped cream or vanilla ice cream are usually used.
- In Iceland, the traditional topping is either rhubarb or blueberry jam with whipped cream on top. Syrup and chocolate spread are also popular substitutes for the jam.
- The Swedish tradition dates at least to the 15th century, and there is even a particular day for the purpose, Våffeldagen (waffle day), which sounds like Vårfrudagen ("Our Lady's Day"), and is therefore used for the purpose. This is March 25 (nine months before Christmas), the Christian holiday of Annunciation. They are usually topped with strawberry jam, bilberry jam, cloudberry jam, raspberry jam, bilberry and raspberry jam, sugar and butter, vanilla ice cream and whipped cream. Other, savory, toppings include salmon roe, cold-smoked salmon and cream fraiche.

=== Gofri ===
Gofri (singular gofre) are waffles in Italy and can be found in the Piedmontese cuisine: they are light and crispy in texture, contain no egg or milk (according to the most ancient recipe) and come both in sweet and savory versions. Central Italian cuisine also features waffle-like cookies, which are locally known as pizzelle, ferratelle (in Abruzzo) or cancelle (in Molise).

=== Stroopwafel ===
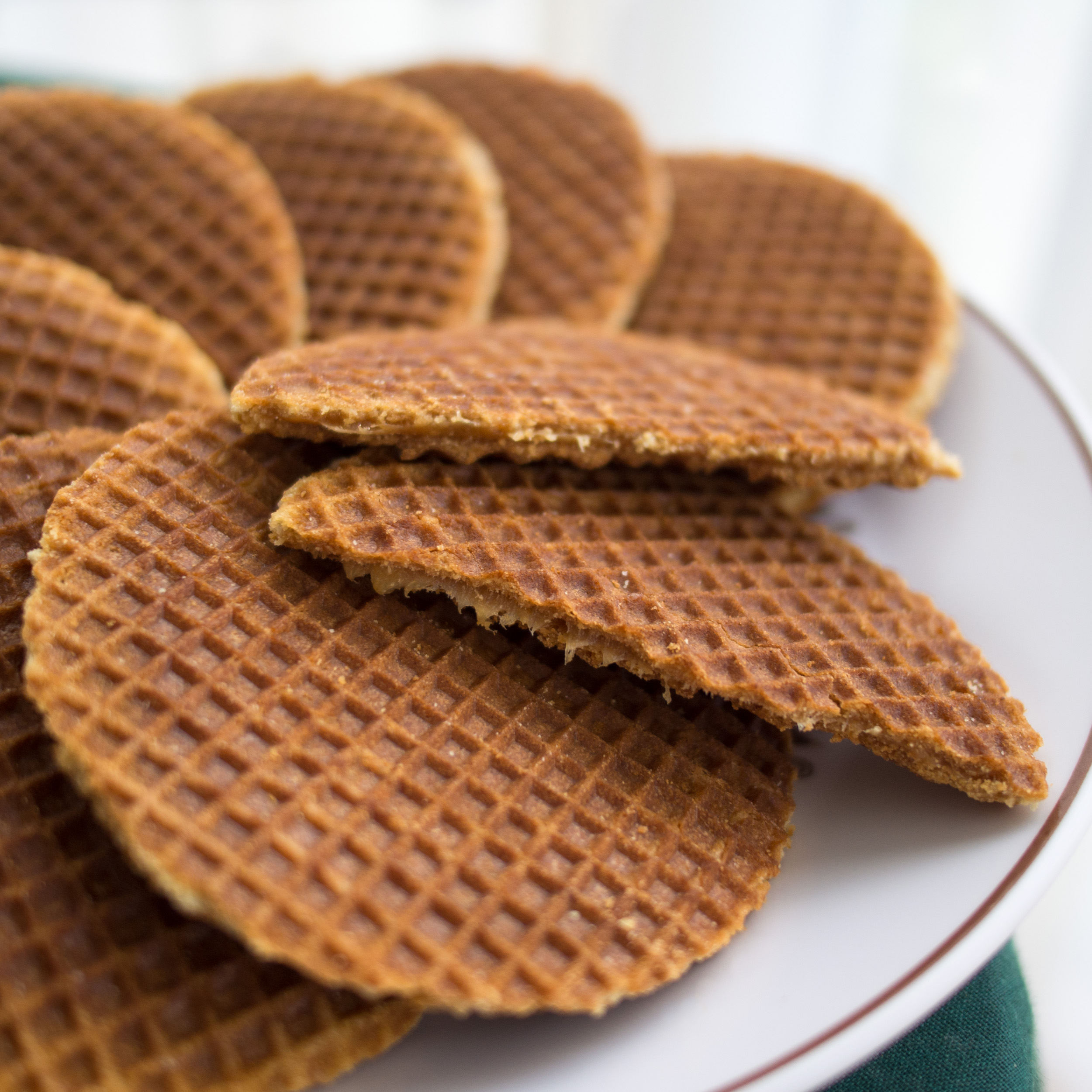
Stroopwafels

Stroopwafels are thin waffles with a syrup filling, which originated from the Dutch city of Gouda. The stiff batter for the waffles is made from flour, butter, brown sugar, yeast, milk, and eggs. Medium-sized balls of batter are put on the waffle iron. When the waffle is baked and while it is still warm, it is cut into two halves. The warm filling made from syrup is spread in between the waffle halves, which glues them together. They are popular in the Netherlands and Belgium and sold in pre-prepared packages in shops and markets.

=== Galettes ===
Galettes campinoises/Kempense galetten are a type of waffle popular in Belgium. They are rigid and crunchy, but are buttery, crumbly and soft in the mouth.

=== Hotdog ===
Hotdog waffles (or waffle dogs) are cylindrical waffles with a hot dog cooked inside them, similar to a corn dog. It is made with specialized waffle irons with cylindrical hotdog-bun shaped molds.

They originate from Hawaii where it was first served at the KC Drive Inn in 1934, owned by the Japanese American Jiro Asato (who later legally changed his name to KC Jiro Asato). The original version has a distinctive shape, with an oblong middle section (containing the hotdog) surrounded by flattened square edges. It is served plain or with a combination of ketchup, mustard, and pickle relish. Its popularity spread to the continental United States, the Philippines (then an American colony), and throughout the rest of the Pacific Islands. Waffle dogs remain an iconic part of Hawaiian culture, though it has waned in popularity in the rest of the US.

It has also remained popular as a street food item in the Philippines, where variants can use other savory fillings like ham, bacon, longganisa, tuna, or cheese; as well as sweet fillings like ube, chocolate, or yema custard. The Filipino versions are also more uniformly cylindrical, with a grid pattern, and are usually served on bamboo skewers. The Filipino fast food chain Waffle Time, founded in 1998, specializes in hotdog waffles as well as other savory and sweet fillings.

In modern times, it has also gained popularity in Thailand and the rest of Southeast Asia, where it is served with ketchup, mayonnaise, or both.

In Norway, a different variation known as pølse i vaffel ("hot dog in a waffle") is particularly associated with the town of Moss. Unlike waffle dogs, the Norwegian version consists of a cooked hot dog wrapped in a traditional, heart-shaped Norwegian waffle, replacing the usual hot dog bun or lompe – a soft, thin Norwegian flatbread made primarily from potatoes and flour, commonly wrapped around hot dogs instead of or in addition to a bun. The local tradition dates back to the 1960s, when ice cream vendor Arne Hellstrøm reportedly began serving hot dogs in waffles after running out of buns and lomper.

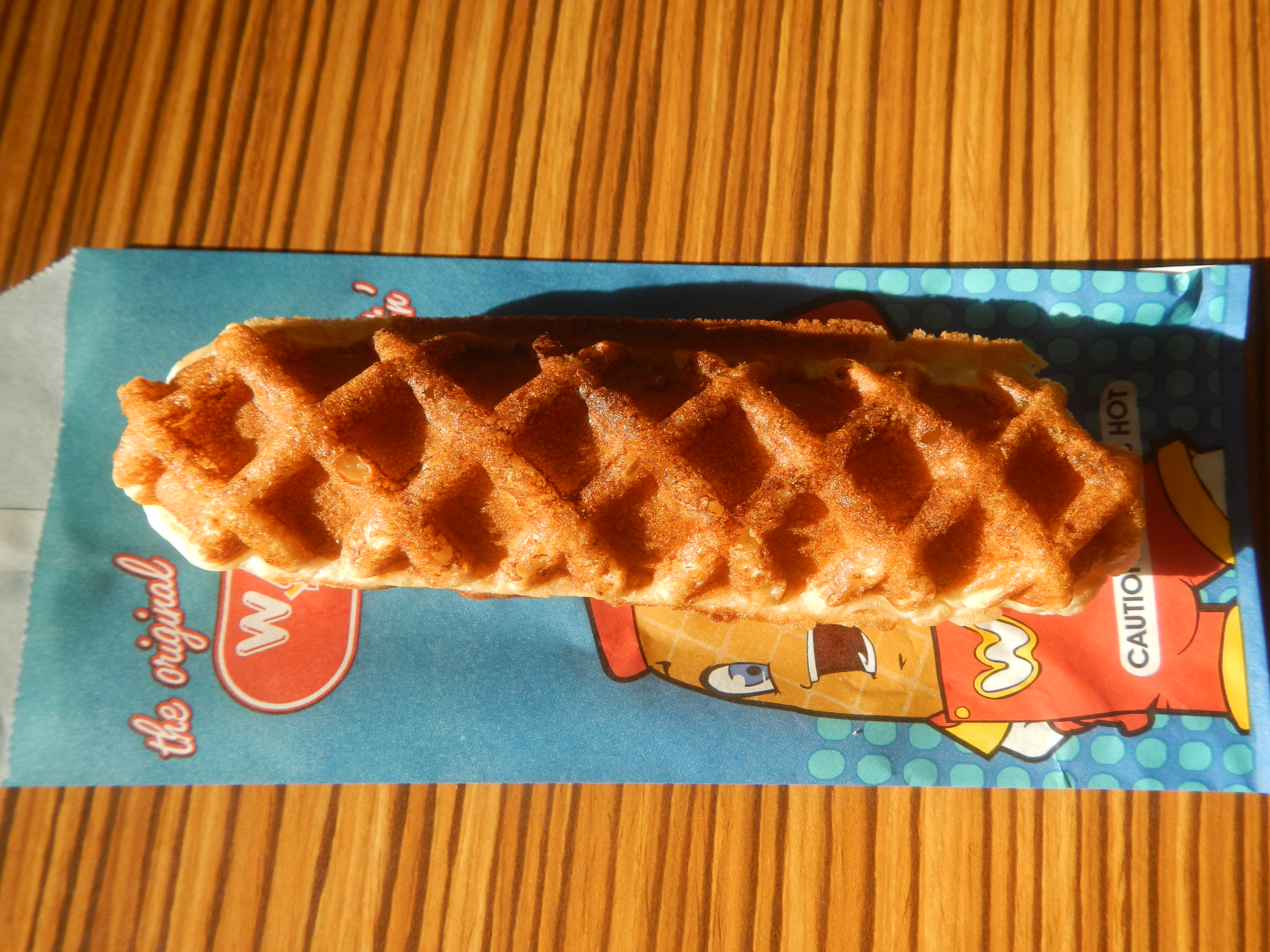
A waffle dog from the Philippines

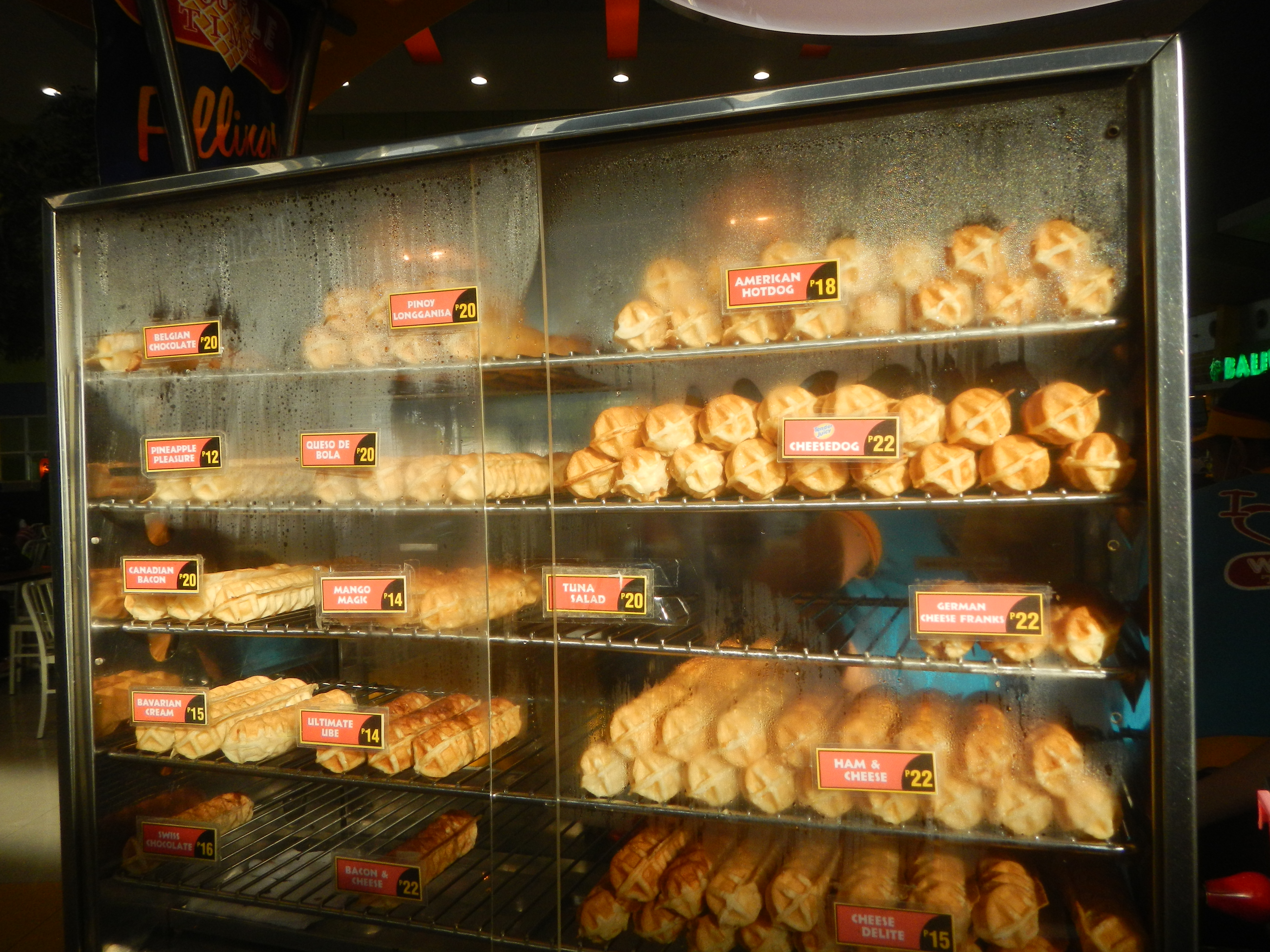
Commercial variants of waffle dogs in the Philippines with various fillings

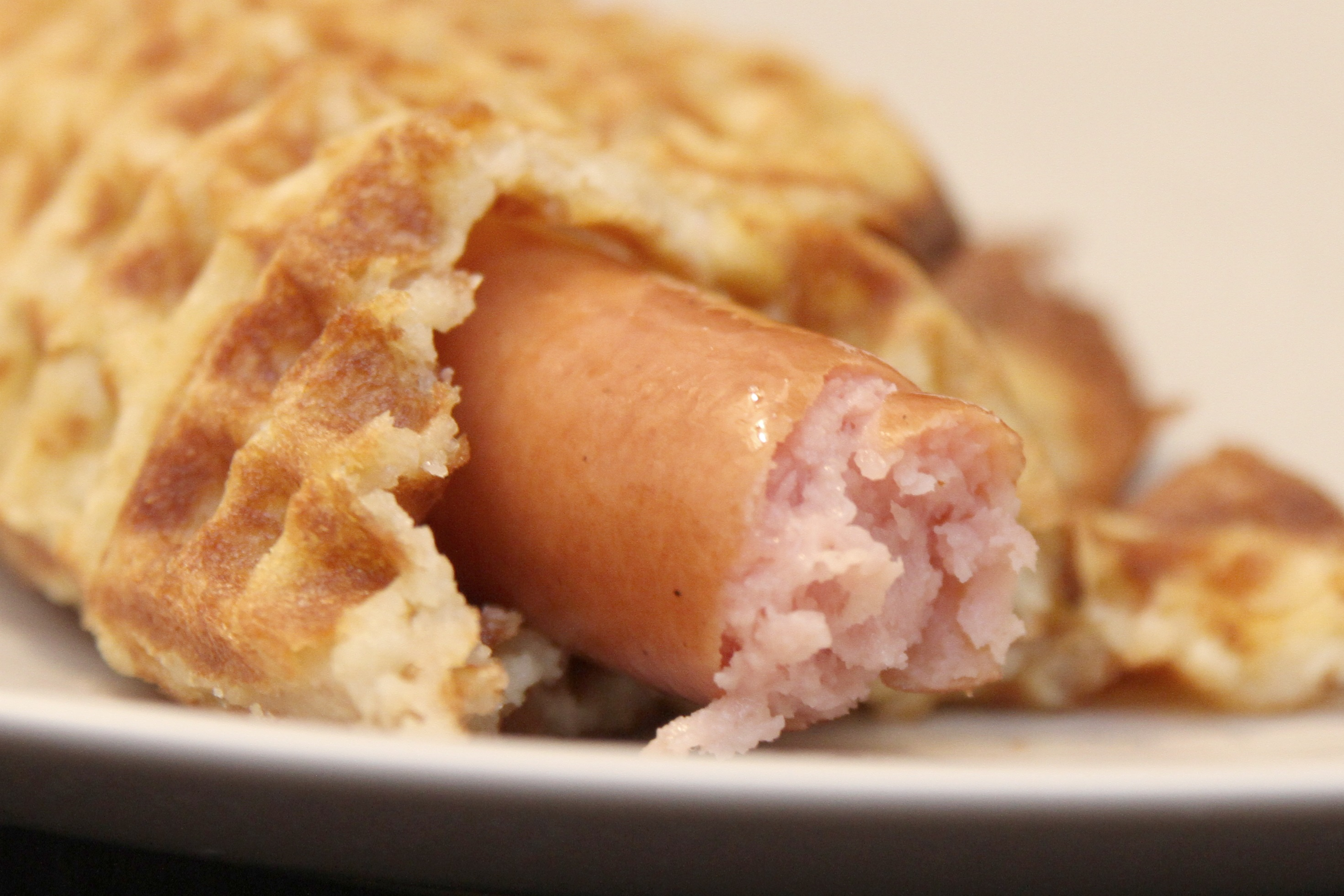
In the Moss area of southeastern Norway, hot dogs are traditionally served in waffles instead of buns or flatbread.

=== Chaffle ===
A chaffle is a waffle made out of eggs and cheese as a replacement for buns in low-carb diets.

== See also ==
- Barquillo
- Egg waffle
- Krumkake
- Moffle – a waffle prepared using mochi
- Pancake
- Pizzelle
- Potato waffle mainly found in the UK and Ireland, made from potato formed into a waffle iron shape
- Wafer
- List of quick breads
