= Waffle iron =

Device used to cook waffles

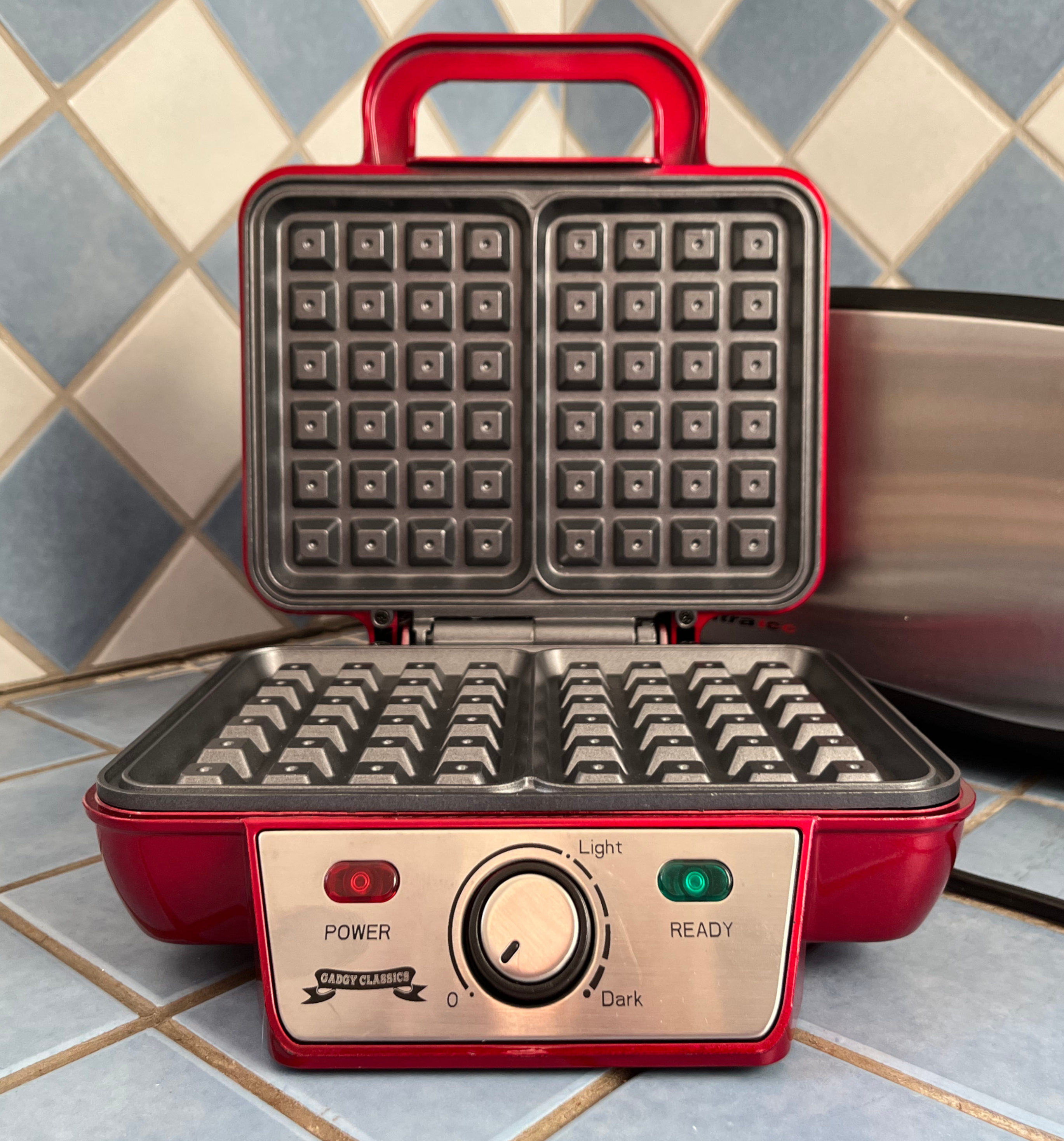
Electric waffle maker

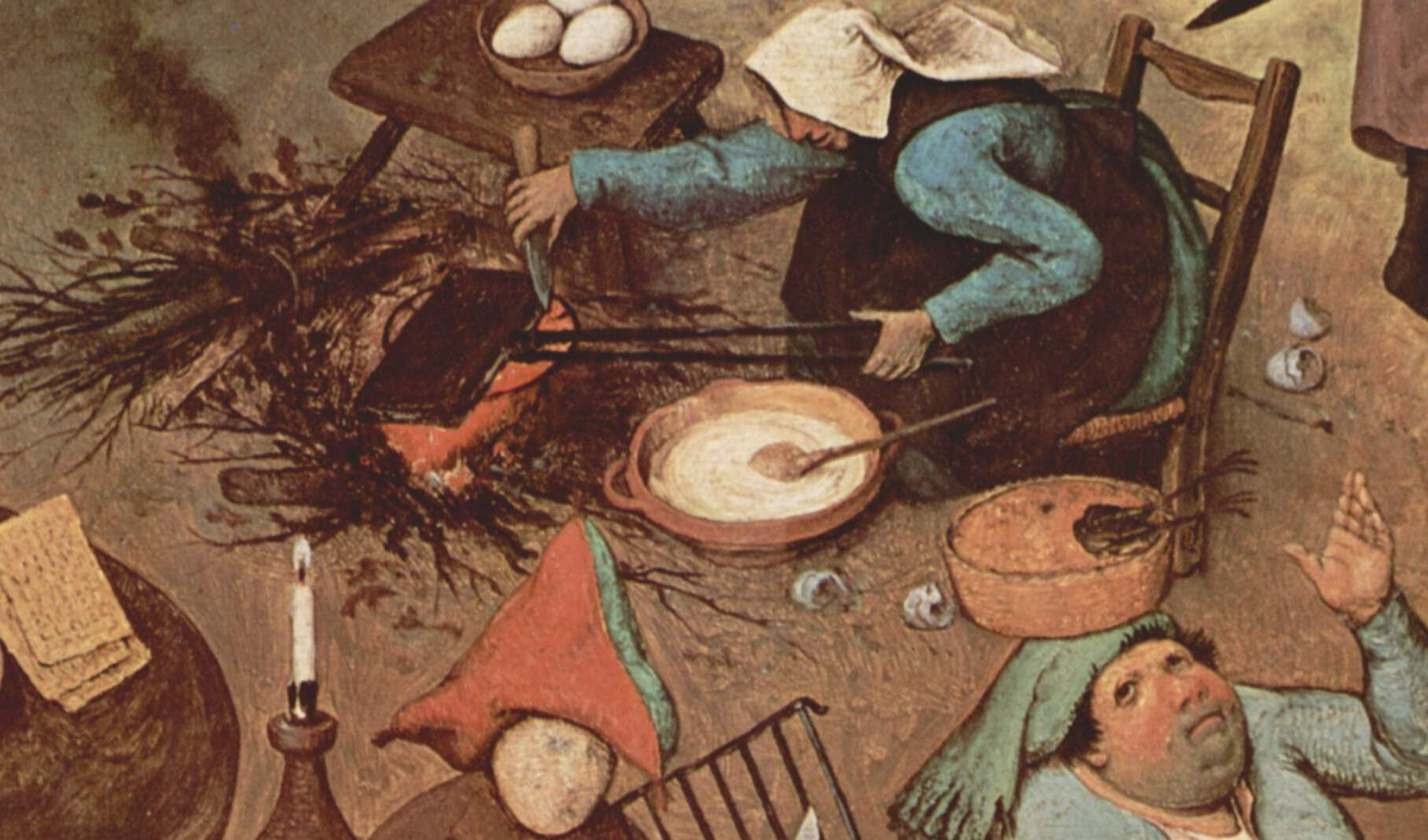
Waffle iron held over a fire in Pieter Bruegel's The Fight Between Carnival and Lent, 1559

A waffle iron or waffle maker is a kitchen utensil used to cook waffles between two hinged metal plates. Both plates have gridded indentations to shape the waffle from the batter or dough placed between them. The plates are heated and the iron is closed while the waffle bakes. Waffles are a quick bread with a light and sweet flavor, similar to pancakes. Their shape is much harder to achieve than a pancake's without a waffle iron. Similar technology is employed to bake wafers, and several other snacks including kue gapit, a waffle-shaped but crunchy Indonesian snack which can be made with both sweet and savory flavors.

== History ==
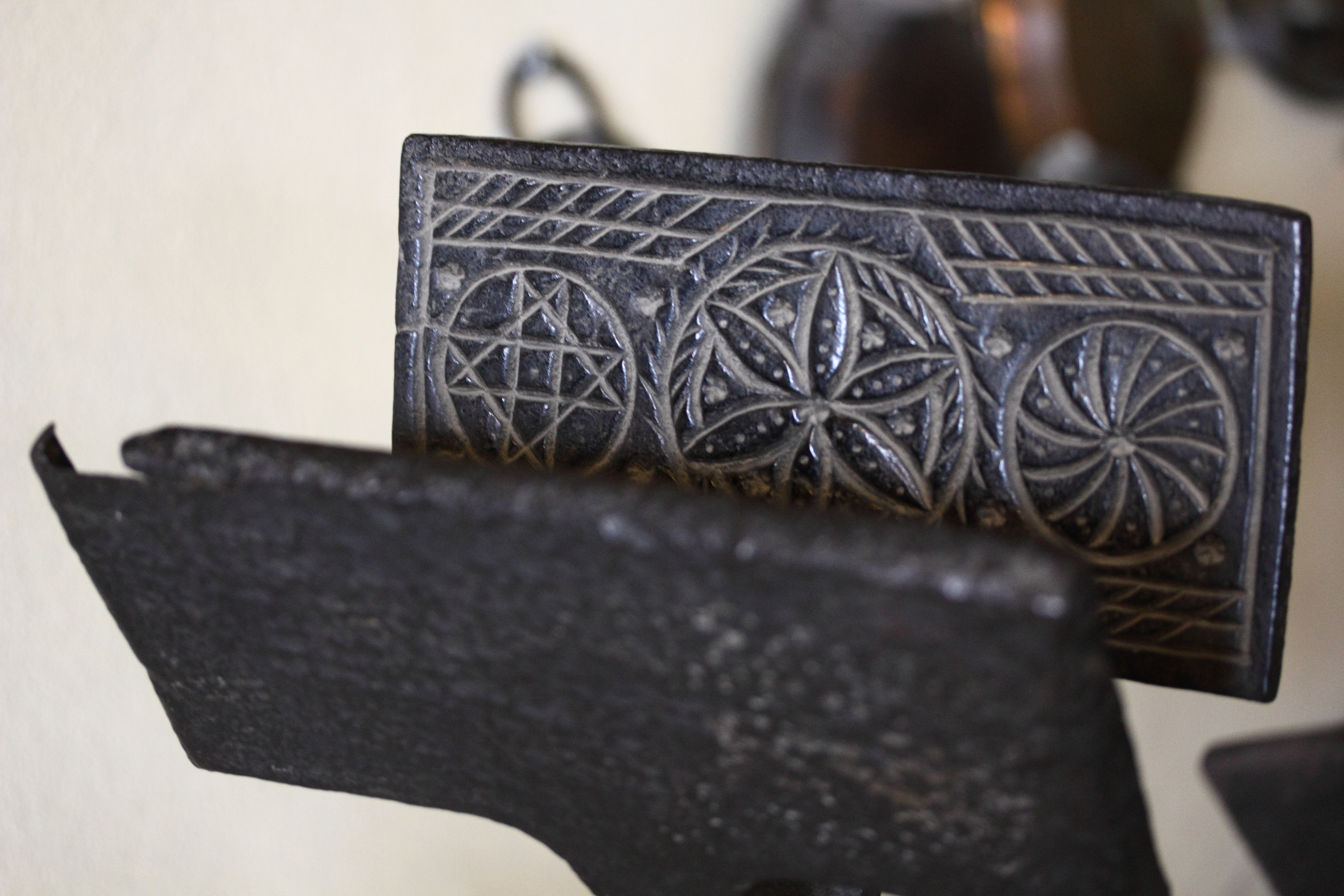
The oublies baked by this early waffle iron were much thinner and wafer-like than modern-day waffles.

Waffle irons were common in France as early as the 12th or 13th century, and became widespread in the Netherlands and the rest of Europe from the 14th century. Secular waffle irons developed alongside host presses, a similar but religious tool used to produce sacramental bread. The earliest waffle irons had shallow indentations suited to baking unleavened wafers, and might better be described as wafer irons or wafer presses. (Note: In many European languages, the names for waffles and wafers are the same, along with the irons used to bake them, e.g., German Waffel and Waffeleisen.) Waffle irons gained deeper indentations as leavening agents were introduced into recipes. There is evidence of primitive waffle irons in Sweden and Norway in Viking Age women's burials.

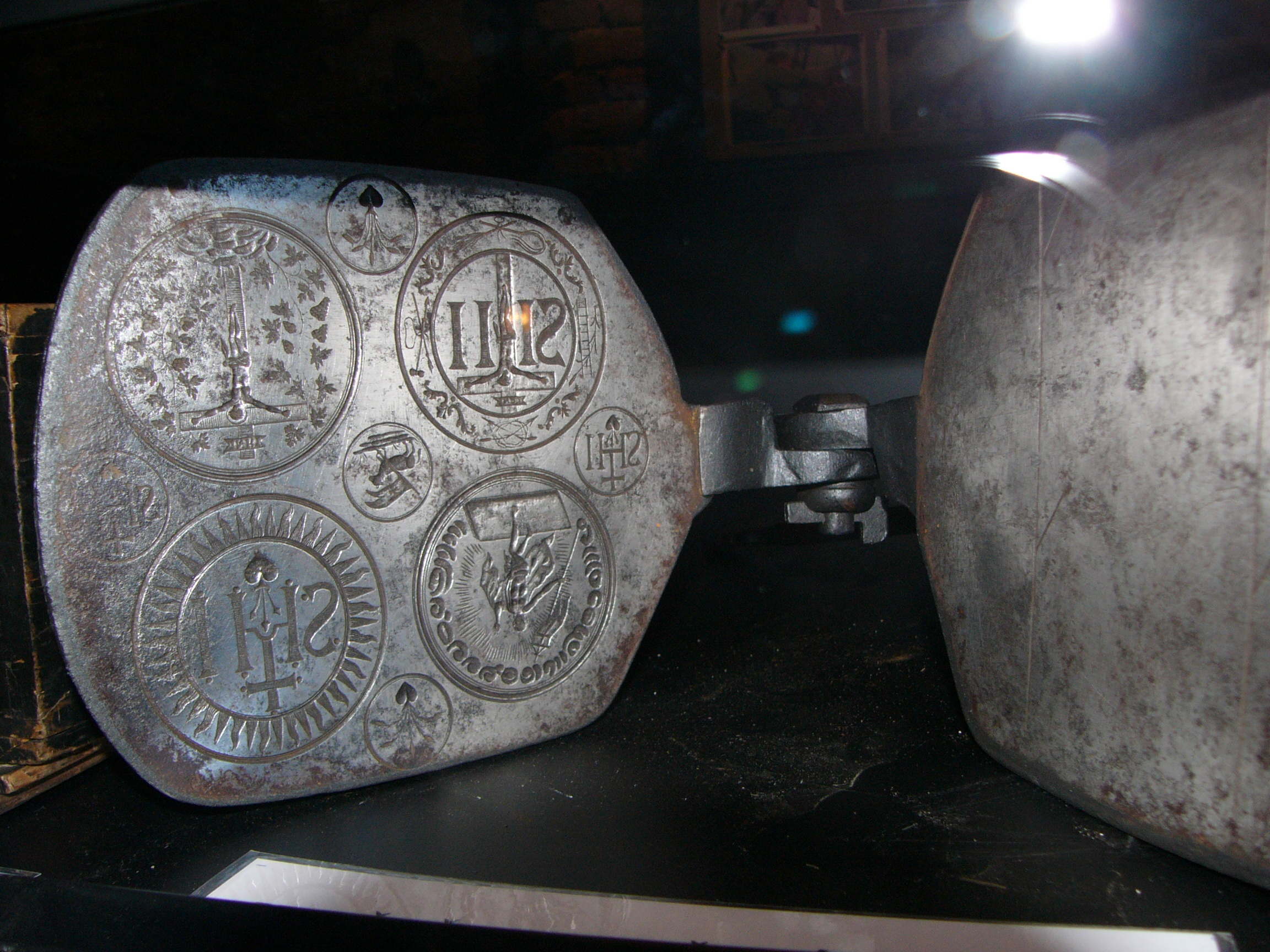
Host press used to bake sacramental bread inscribed with religious symbols. Host presses like this developed alongside early waffle irons.

Waffle irons were originally constructed of two hinged iron plates connected to two long, wooden handles. The plates were often made to imprint elaborate patterns on the waffle, including coats of arms, landscapes, or religious symbols. Waffles would be held at a distance and baked over the hearth fire.

In 1869, American Cornelius Swartwout was the first to patent a stove-top waffle iron. While waffle irons of sorts may have existed since the 1400s, Swarthout intended to perfect the design by adding a handle and a hinge that swiveled in a cast-iron collar, allowing the waffle-maker to flip the iron without danger of slippage or burns. In 1891 John Kliembach, a German immigrant living in Shamokin, Pennsylvania, became a traveling salesman of waffles after fashioning an iron for the Mansion House Hotel. Kliembach sold waffles for a penny each or ten cents for a dozen. This was popular at the Chicago World's Fair. In 1911, General Electric produced a prototype electric waffle iron, and production began around 1918. Later, as the waffle iron became more prevalent, its appearance was improved.

== Varieties ==
Traditional waffle irons are attached to tongs with wooden handles and held over an open flame, or set on a stove. Most modern waffle irons are self-contained tabletop household appliances using electric heating elements controlled by internal thermostats. Electric irons can come with either removable or non-removable plates. Professional waffle irons are usually made of uncoated cast iron, whereas domestic models, particularly cast aluminum ones, are often Teflon coated. Many have a light that goes off when the iron reaches a set temperature.

Some waffle makers produce a very thin waffle, and can be used for making waffle cones or Pizzelle. While there is no set standard for waffle shapes or thicknesses, models that produce the most common shapes and thicknesses are often labeled as "traditional" or "classic". Models that make thicker and larger pocketed waffles are often labeled as "Belgian". In the US, the most common criteria for "Belgian waffles" are their thickness and pocket size, although they are also distinguished by using a base that typically includes yeasted batter and pearl sugar.

Stroopwafels are thin, round waffle cookies made from two layers of sweet baked dough held together by caramel filling. They are a well-known Dutch treat, popular throughout the Netherlands and the former Dutch Empire, and exported abroad.

== Gallery ==
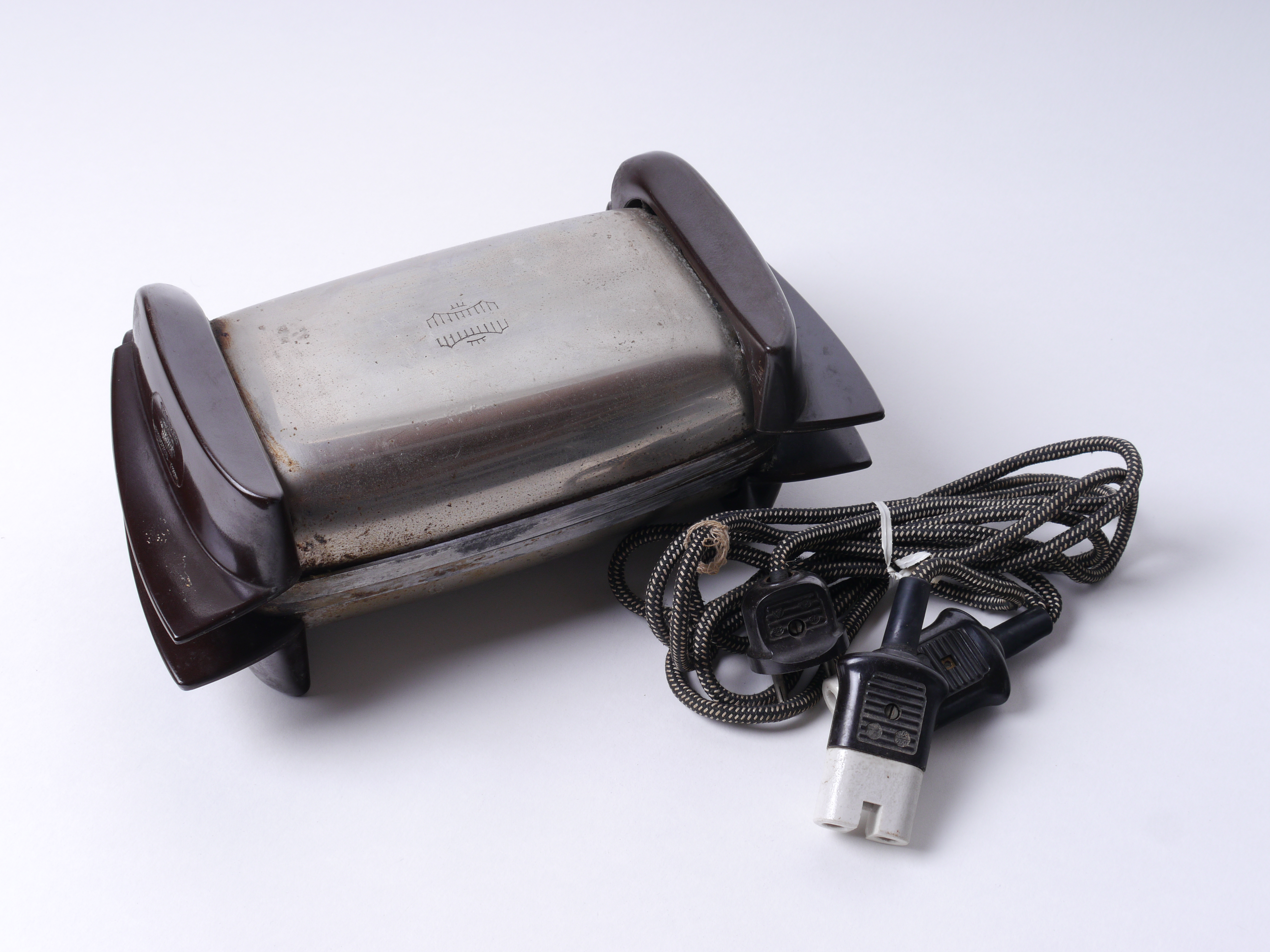
Electric waffle iron by the brand Kalorik, in the collection of the Museum of Industry (Ghent, Belgium)

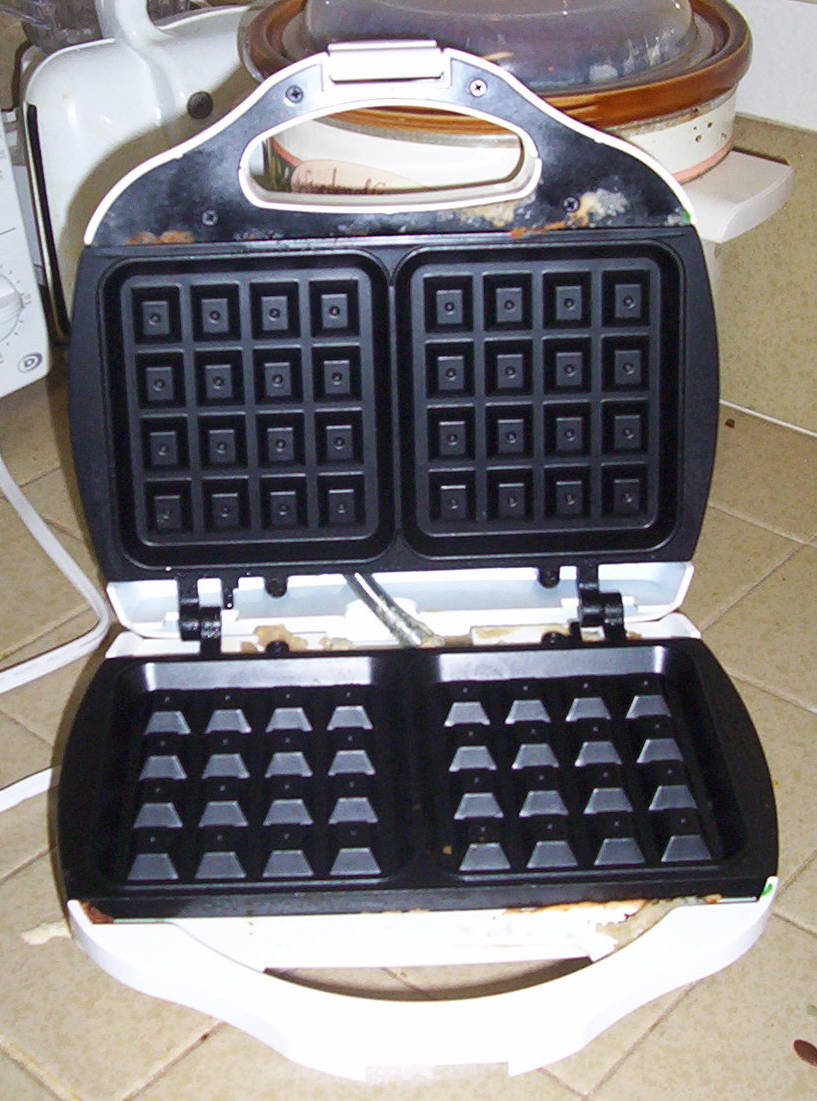
A North American Belgian-style waffle iron

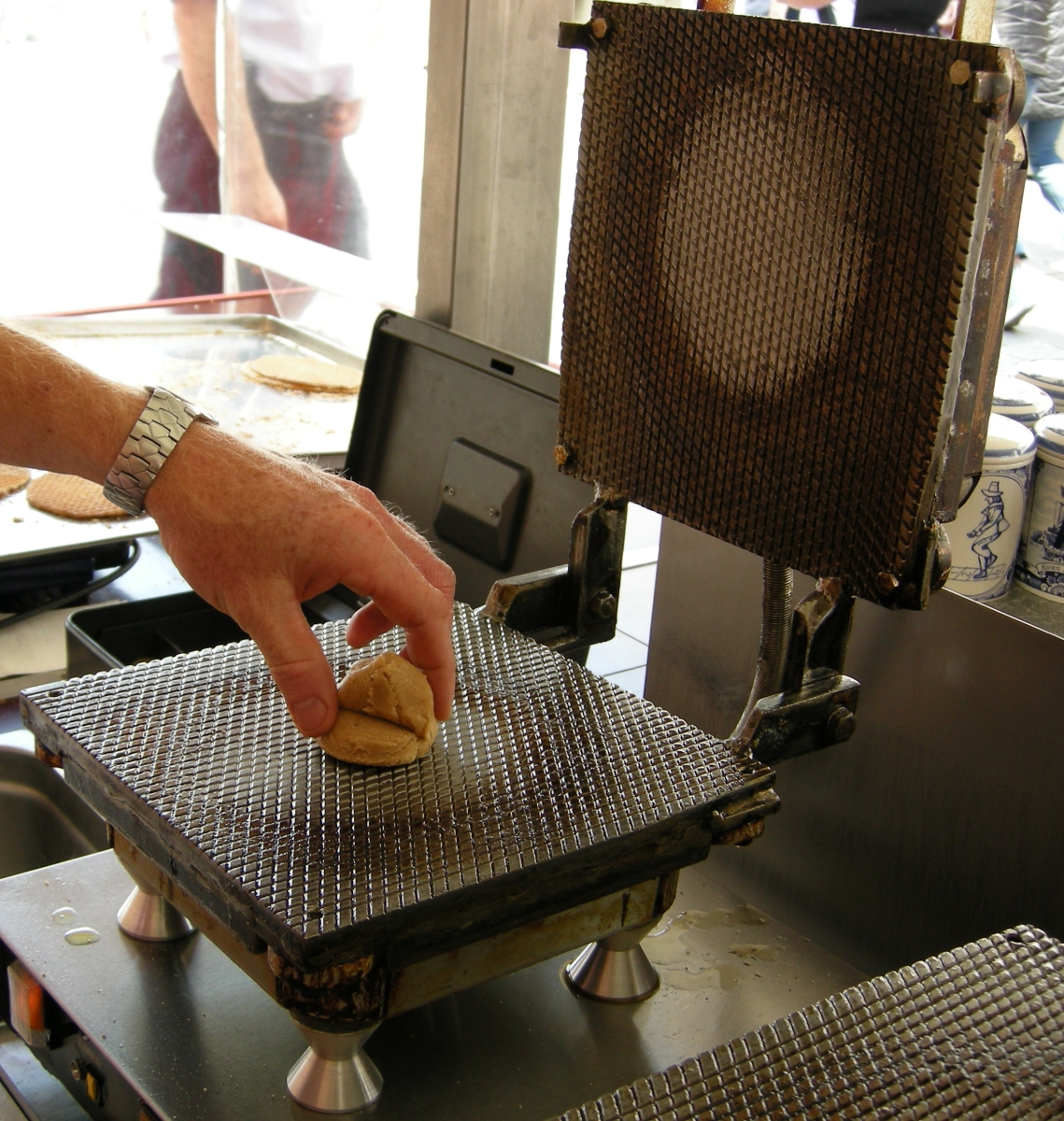
A waffle iron used to make stroopwafels in Nijmegen

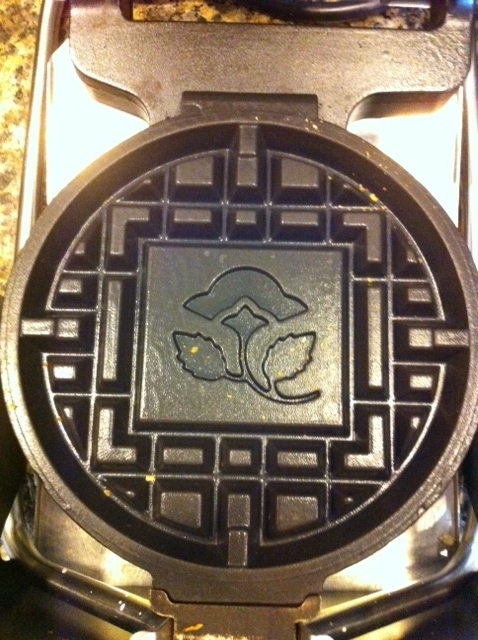
Waffle iron with logo of Country Inns & Suites, advertising the company logo on waffles made by customers

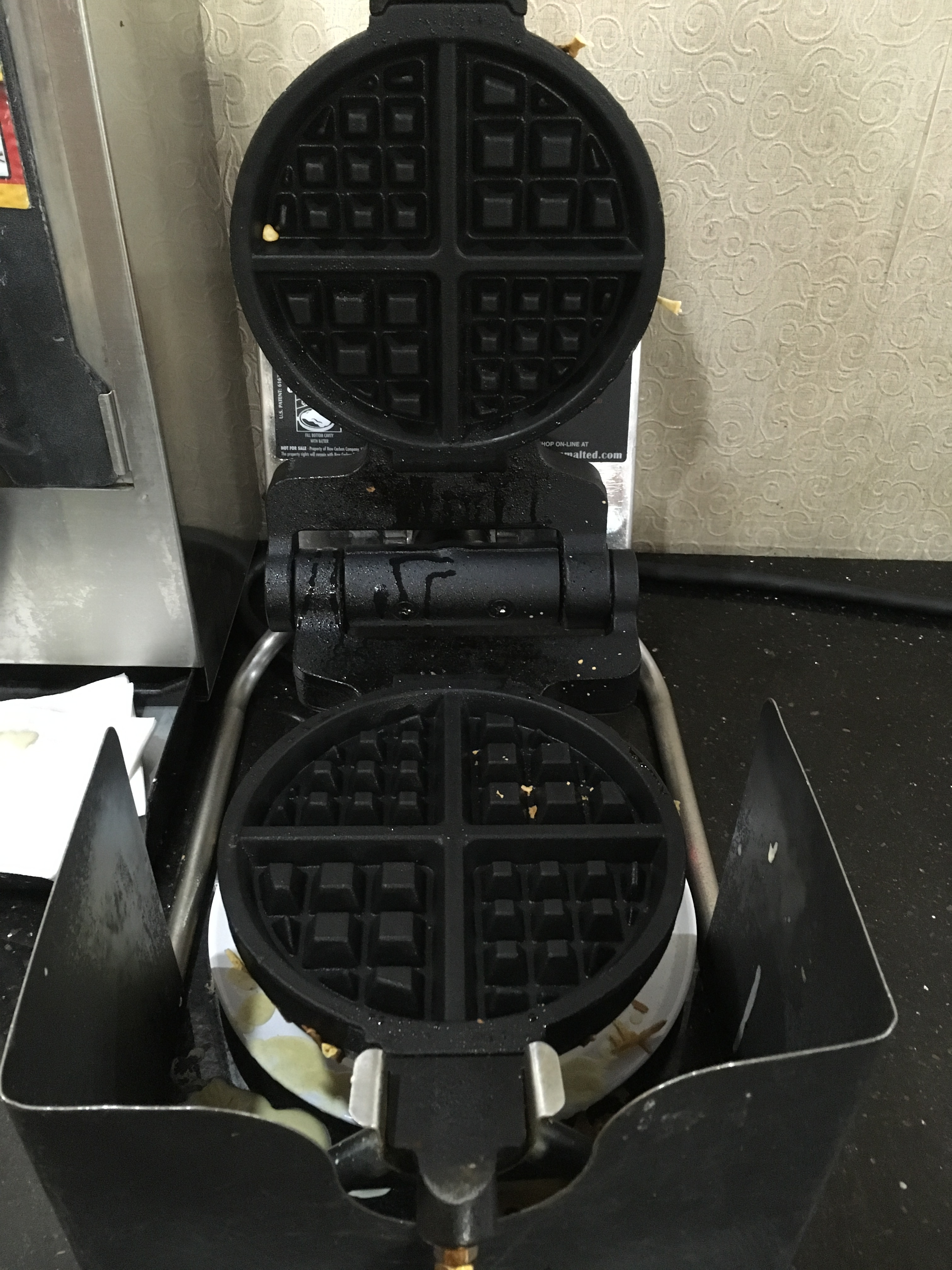
This is a waffle iron of the type commonly found at breakfast counters at motels/hotels in America. Customers pour in batter, close the waffle iron, and a timer begins, then sounds off when the waffle is ready.

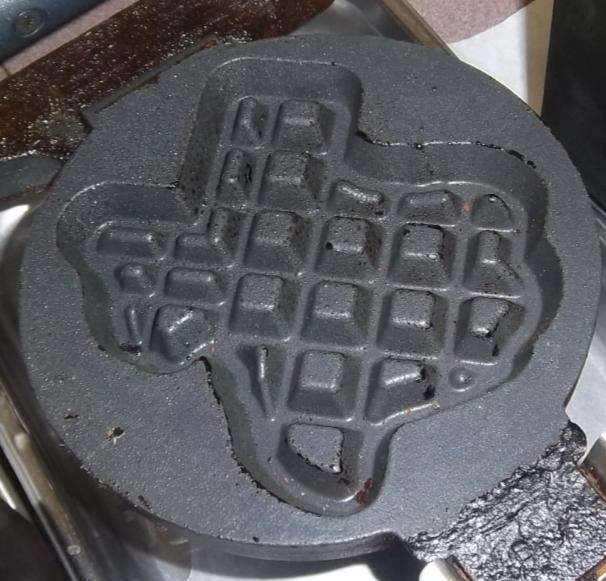
A waffle iron in the shape of Texas, commonly found at motels in the state

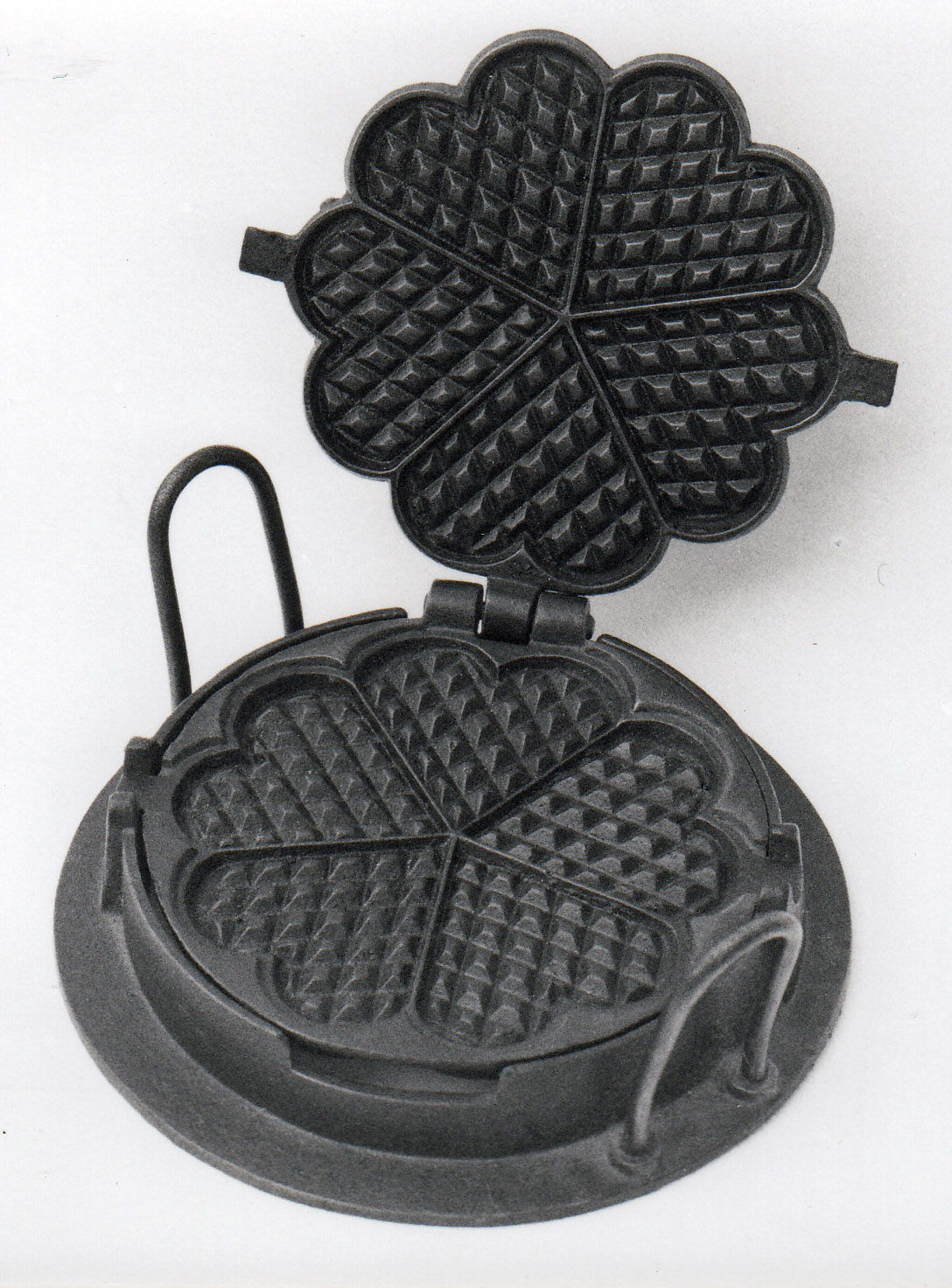
In Scandinavia, heart-shaped waffle irons are common.

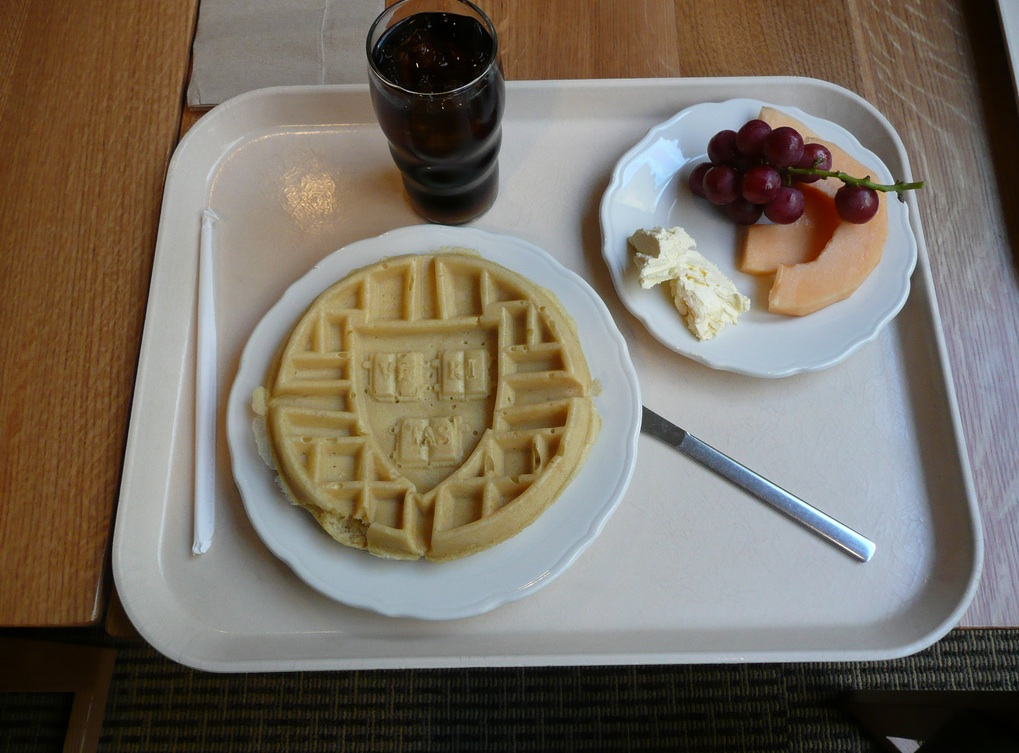
Waffle made with a customized waffle iron, showing the Harvard escutcheon

== See also ==
- Brown Bobby, a triangular American donut made in a waffle iron–like machine
- Krampouz, a French manufacturer of small cooking appliances
- List of cooking appliances
- Timeline of culinary technologies
- Pancake machine
- Sandwich toaster, various machines, often waffle iron sized, that press and cook a filling between two slices of bread, to make a hot filled sandwich, with the edges sealed together
- Moffle
