= Brown Bobby =

Type of donut

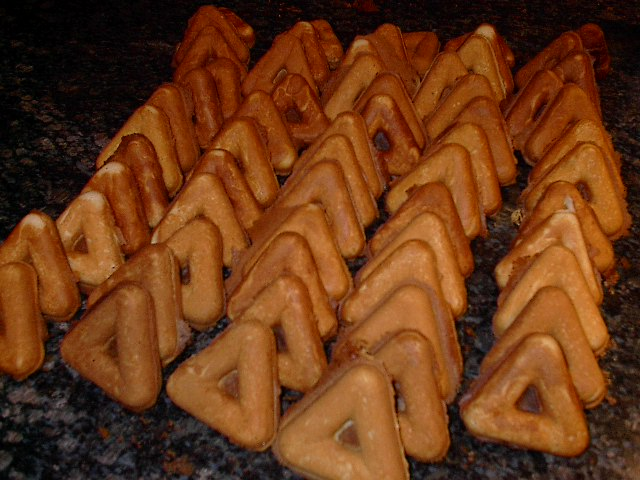
- Brown Bobby doughnuts laid out on a counter
- Type: Doughnut
- Place of origin: United States

A Brown Bobby is a triangular doughnut. It is baked in a Brown Bobby machine, which resembles and is operated similarly to a waffle iron. These machines were created by the Food Display Machine Corporation in Chicago, Illinois, U.S., around the 1920s and possibly later.

== History ==
The Food Display Machine Corporation was located at 500 North Dearborn Street in Chicago. Its president was H. Adams. In the mid-1920s, through advertisements in Popular Mechanics magazine and perhaps other means as well, these machines were marketed as a way to start a small business. The machine’s manual has 3 parts:

1. Seven Proven Business Plans for Operating a Successful BROWN BOBBY Business
2. How to get the Best Results from your BROWN BOBBY Machine
3. Recipes that Whet the Buying Appetite

The seven business plans described are:

1. Selling Direct to Homes
2. Getting the Restaurant and Drug Store Business
3. Getting the Grocery Business
4. Window Demonstrating and Sampling
5. Getting the Student Trade
6. Selling Through Salesmen
7. Running a BROWN BOBBY Store of your own

Some of the suggested locations for selling included candy stores, theatres, chain stores, bowling alleys, cigar stores, railway stations, dance halls, waiting rooms, garages, filling stations, general stores, and soft drink parlors.

One could also obtain boxes and bags from the company for packaging the doughnuts. The machines are no longer manufactured as the Food Display Machine Corporation has long been out of business. According to the Annual Report of the Federal Trade Commission for 1937 the company was issued a Cease and Desist order for misrepresenting possible or maximum earnings for its potato chip machines.

== The machine ==
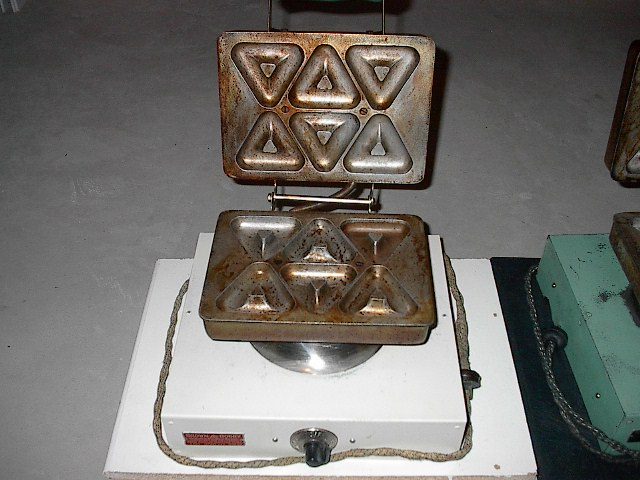
A Brown Bobby machine, open

The Brown Bobby machine resembled and operated similar to a waffle iron. Its surfaces were made of aluminium and were prepared for baking by coating with paraffin, though users today would most often use cooking spray. The machine had a high (600 watt/surfaces connected in parallel) and a low (300 watt/surfaces connected in series) setting. Cooking was done on the high setting, the low setting was for allowing the machine to remain idle. Machines were available as either a single (a.k.a. Brown Bobby Junior) for US$52 or as two machines riveted together into a single unit for US$100. Since these machines are no longer manufactured they are prized by their owners and often handed down to subsequent generations to continue a tradition of Brown Bobby making, especially during the holidays.

== The doughnuts ==
The Brown Bobby manual included 10 recipes for doughnuts, 4 icing recipes and a number of prepared doughnut mixes were also available. Recipes included Plain, Wholewheat, Bran, Spice, Nut, Tutti-Frutti, Chocolate and Oatmeal. The doughnuts were touted as “greaseless” because they were not deep-fried, but as the included recipe indicates, there was an amount of fat in the doughnut itself.

== See also ==
- List of doughnut varieties
- List of fried dough varieties
- List of breakfast foods
