= Cornelius Swartwout =

American inventor (1839–1910)

- Born: July 25, 1839; Westerlo, New York
- Died: December 17, 1910 (aged 71); Kings County, New York
- Known for: patented an improved waffle iron

Diagrams of Swartwout's waffle iron

Cornelius Swartwout (July 25, 1839 – December 17, 1910) was an American inventor who filed an early US patent related to waffle irons.

== Biography ==
Swartwout was born in Westerlo, New York. The Swartwout family lineage goes back to Groningen in the Dutch Republic. He enlisted in the Union Army in July 1861, serving with the 3rd New York Cavalry.

== Waffle iron and US patent ==
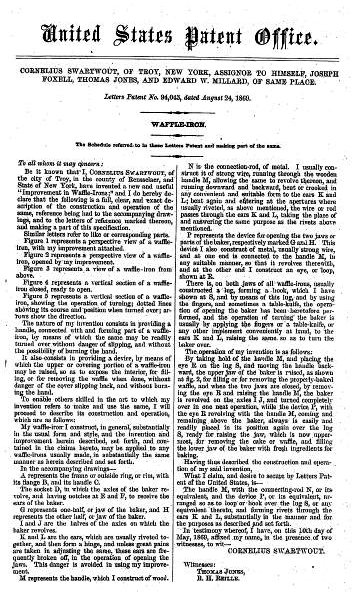
Swartwout's letters patent

The earliest waffle irons were not the work of Swartwout; instead, they originated in the Netherlands circa 14th century. They were typically made of two hinged iron plates connected to two long wooden handles, the plates often imprinted elaborate patterns on the waffles, coat of arms, landscapes, religious symbols, and the like. These irons were held over a hearth fire for baking.

On August 24, 1869, Swartwout was awarded a US patent for an "Improvement in Waffle-Irons", consisting of a novel handle for opening, closing and turning a stovetop waffle iron. His invention looked nothing like modern electric models. Fashioned to sit on wood or gas stoves, the cast-iron plates were joined by a hinge that swiveled in a cast-iron collar.

== Legacy ==
In memory of Swartwout's patent, National Waffle Day in the United States is celebrated on August 24 each year.
