= Moffle =

Japanese dish; waffle rice cake

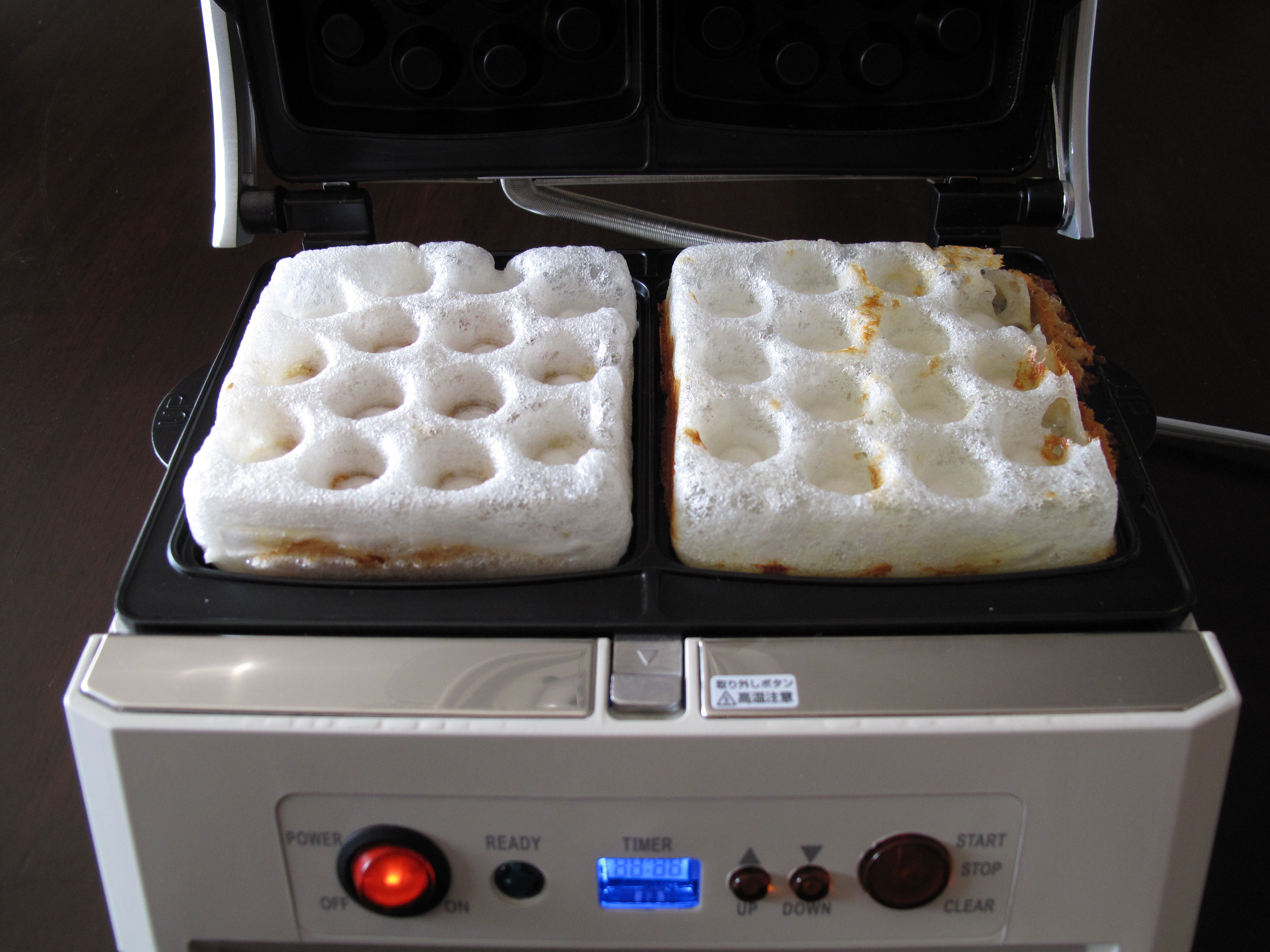
Moffles

A moffle is a Japanese dish consisting of mochi rice cake cooked in a waffle iron, which creates a waffle. A typical cooked moffle has a crunchy exterior with a thin interior layer of glutinous mochi. When prepared as a dessert, it is typically served with various condiments. It is also prepared as a snack food using ingredients such as ham and cheese or cod roe.

Sanyei Company claims to have invented the moffle, receiving a trademark for the product in 2000. Sanyei mass-produces moffle makers for consumer and commercial use. Some restaurants use flavored mochi to prepare the moffle.

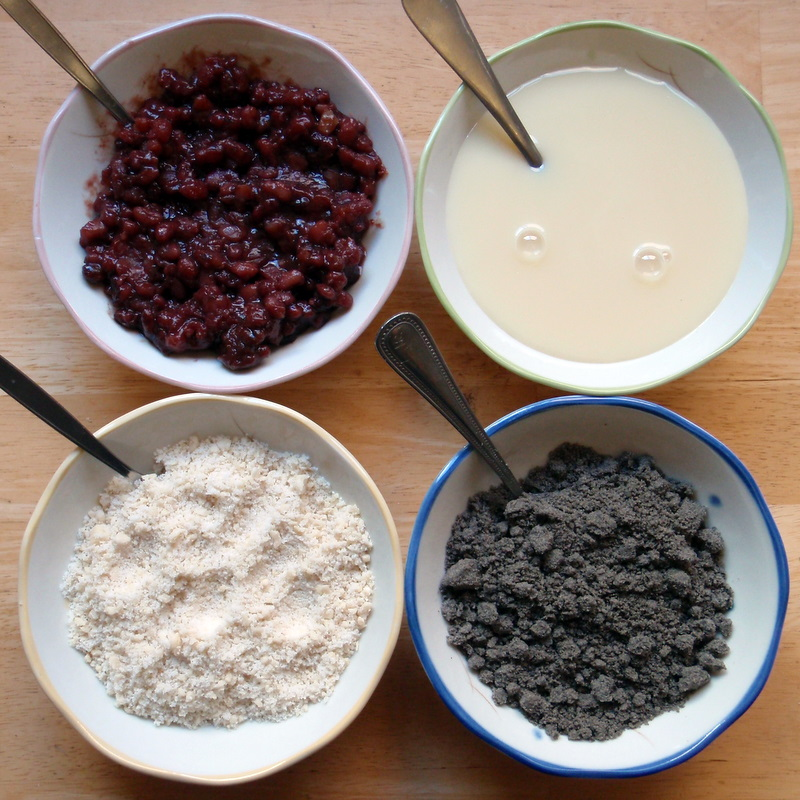
Some moffle condiments at a restaurant

== See also ==
- List of rice dishes
- Japanese cuisine
