= 50th Reserve Division =

50th Reserve Division (50. Reserve-Division)
- Active: 1914–1919
- Country: Germany
- Branch: Army
- Type: Infantry
- Size: Approx. 15,000
- Engagements: World War I: Battle of Łódź (1914), Gorlice-Tarnów Offensive, Second Battle of Champagne, Battle of the Somme, Battle of Arras (1917), Passchendaele, German spring offensive, Second Battle of the Marne, Hundred Days Offensive

The 50th Reserve Division (50. Reserve-Division) was a formation of the Imperial German Army in World War I. The division was formed in September 1914 and organized over the next month, arriving in the line in October. It was part of the first wave of new divisions formed at the outset of World War I, which were numbered the 43rd through 54th Reserve Divisions. The division was initially part of XXV Reserve Corps. It was disbanded in 1919 during the demobilization of the German Army after World War I.

== Recruitment ==
The division was relatively mixed in composition. The 229th Reserve Infantry Regiment was raised in Lower Silesia. The 230th Reserve Infantry Regiment was raised throughout Silesia. The 231st Reserve Infantry Regiment was raised in Thuringia, mainly in the duchy of Saxe-Altenburg and the Prussian Province of Saxony. The 232nd Reserve Infantry Regiment was raised in Prussian Saxony and the Duchy of Anhalt. The 232nd Reserve Infantry Regiment was transferred to the 107th Infantry Division in June 1915, and new replacements for the other regiments tended to come from the Prussian Province of Hanover and the Duchy of Brunswick, with the 229th being described in Allied intelligence documents as becoming a Brunswick regiment.

== Combat chronicle ==
The 50th Reserve Division initially fought on the Eastern Front, entering the line in mid-October. It fought in the Battle of Łódź in November–December 1914 and then spent most of the period until mid-1915 fighting along the Rawka and Bzura rivers. In July and August 1915 it fought in the Gorlice-Tarnów Offensive and then participated in the follow-on battles and engagements until reaching the Berezina River at the end of September. The division was then transferred to the Western Front. It fought in the Second Battle of Champagne in October and November 1915 and remained in the line in the Champagne until late December, when it went to Flanders and the Artois, where it remained into 1916. It saw action in the Battle of the Somme later that year, and remained in the Somme until April 1917. In 1917, it fought in the Battle of Arras and the Battle of Passchendaele, and saw action at Cambrai. In 1918, it fought in the German spring offensive and the Second Battle of the Marne. It resisted the various Allied counter-offensives, including the Hundred Days Offensive, and was fighting in the Champagne and on the Meuse when World War I ended. In 1918, Allied intelligence rated the division as second class, and noted its tough fighting in numerous battles.

== Order of battle on formation ==
The 50th Reserve Division was initially organized as a square division, with essentially the same organization as the reserve divisions formed on mobilization. The order of battle of the 50th Reserve Division on September 10, 1914, was as follows:

- 99.Reserve-Infanterie-Brigade
  - Reserve-Infanterie-Regiment Nr. 229
  - Reserve-Infanterie-Regiment Nr. 230
  - Reserve-Jäger-Bataillon Nr. 22
- 100. Reserve-Infanterie -Brigade
  - Reserve-Infanterie-Regiment Nr. 231
  - Reserve-Infanterie-Regiment Nr. 232
- Reserve-Kavallerie-Abteilung Nr. 50
- Reserve-Feldartillerie-Regiment Nr. 50
- Reserve-Pionier-Kompanie Nr. 50

== Order of battle on February 27, 1918 ==
The 50th Reserve Division was triangularized in June 1915. Over the course of the war, other changes took place, including the formation of artillery and signals commands and the enlargement of combat engineer support to a full pioneer battalion. The order of battle on February 27, 1918, was as follows:

- 99.Reserve-Infanterie -Brigade
  - Reserve-Infanterie-Regiment Nr. 229
  - Reserve-Infanterie-Regiment Nr. 230
  - Reserve-Infanterie-Regiment Nr. 231
  - Maschinengewehr-Scharfschützen-Abteilung Nr. 60
- Reserve-Kavallerie-Abteilung Nr. 50
- Artillerie-Kommandeur 68
  - Reserve-Feldartillerie-Regiment Nr. 50
  - Fußartillerie-Bataillon Nr. 81
- Pionier-Bataillon Nr. 350
- Divisions-Nachrichten-Kommandeur 450
