= 107th Infantry Division (German Empire) =

107th Infantry Division (107. Infanterie-Division)
- Active: 1915–19
- Country: German Empire
- Branch: Army
- Type: Infantry
- Size: Approx. 12,500
- Engagements: World War I: Gorlice–Tarnów Offensive; Serbian Campaign; Macedonian front; Battle of Cambrai (1917); German spring offensive; First Battle of the Somme (1918); Meuse-Argonne Offensive

The 107th Infantry Division (107. Infanterie-Division) was a unit of the Imperial German Army in World War I. The division was formed on June 1, 1915, and organized over the next few weeks. It was part of a wave of new infantry divisions formed in 1915. The division was disbanded in 1919 during the demobilization of the German Army after World War I.

The division was formed primarily from the excess infantry regiments of existing divisions which were being triangularized. The division's 213th Infantry Brigade was formerly the 98th Reserve Infantry Brigade of the 49th Reserve Division, and came to the division with the 227th Reserve Infantry Regiment. The 52nd Reserve Infantry Regiment came from the 5th Reserve Division and the 232nd Reserve Infantry Regiment came from the 50th Reserve Division.

== Combat chronicle ==
The 107th Infantry Division initially served on the Eastern Front, seeing its first action in the Battle of Lemberg (now Lviv) and later participating in the capture of Brest-Litovsk and of Pinsk. It was then transferred south to participate in the Serbian Campaign. After a brief respite on the Macedonian front, the division went back to Russia at the beginning of January 1916. In November 1917, the division was sent to the Western Front, entering the line in the German "Siegfried" position. It fought in the tank Battle of Cambrai in November 1917 and in the German counterattack in December. In April 1918, the division participated in the German spring offensive, fighting in the First Battle of the Somme (1918), also known as the Second Battle of the Somme (to distinguish it from the 1916 battle). It remained in the Somme salient and fought against various Allied counteroffensives. The division moved to the St. Mihiel salient in September and then occupied the line in the Woëvre region. In October, it met the Allied Meuse-Argonne Offensive. The division remained in the line until the end of the war. Allied intelligence rated the division as third class.

== Order of battle on formation ==
The 107th Infantry Division was formed as a triangular division. The order of battle of the division on June 3, 1915, was as follows:

- 213. Infanterie-Brigade
  - Reserve-Infanterie-Regiment Nr. 52
  - Reserve-Infanterie-Regiment Nr. 227
  - Reserve-Infanterie-Regiment Nr. 232
- 1.Eskadron/Kürassier-Regiment Nr. 6
- 2.Eskadron/Kürassier-Regiment Nr. 6
- Feldartillerie-Regiment Nr. 213
- Fußartillerie-Batterie Nr. 107
- Pionier-Kompanie Nr. 213

== Late-war order of battle ==
The division underwent relatively few organizational changes over the course of the war. Cavalry was reduced, artillery and signals commands were formed, and combat engineer support was expanded to a full pioneer battalion. The order of battle on March 2, 1918, was as follows:

- 213.Infanterie-Brigade
  - Reserve-Infanterie-Regiment Nr. 52
  - Reserve-Infanterie-Regiment Nr. 227
  - Reserve-Infanterie-Regiment Nr. 232
- 3.Eskadron/Ulanen-Regiment Nr. 1
- Artillerie-Kommandeur 157
  - Feldartillerie-Regiment Nr. 213
  - I. Bataillon/Kgl. Bayerisches 6. Fußartillerie-Regiment
- Pionier-Bataillon Nr. 107
  - Pionier-Kompanie Nr. 213
  - 4. Kompanie/Pionier-Bataillon Nr. 21
  - Minenwerfer-Kompanie Nr. 107
- Divisions-Nachrichten-Kommandeur 107
