= Waffle cookie =

Waffle cookie may refer to:

- Stroopwafel, a Dutch waffle cookie
- Pizzelle, an Italian waffle cookie
- Bánh kẹp, a Vietnamese waffle cookie made from rice flour
