= Jules Destrooper =

Belgian food company

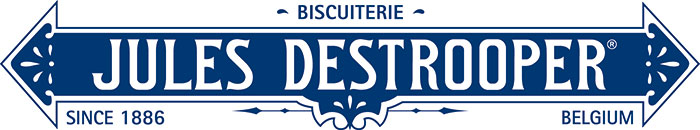
- Company type: Private
- Founded: 1886
- Headquarters: Lo-Reninge, Belgium
- Products: cookie
- Number of employees: 160 (2015)
- Website: www.jules-destrooper.com

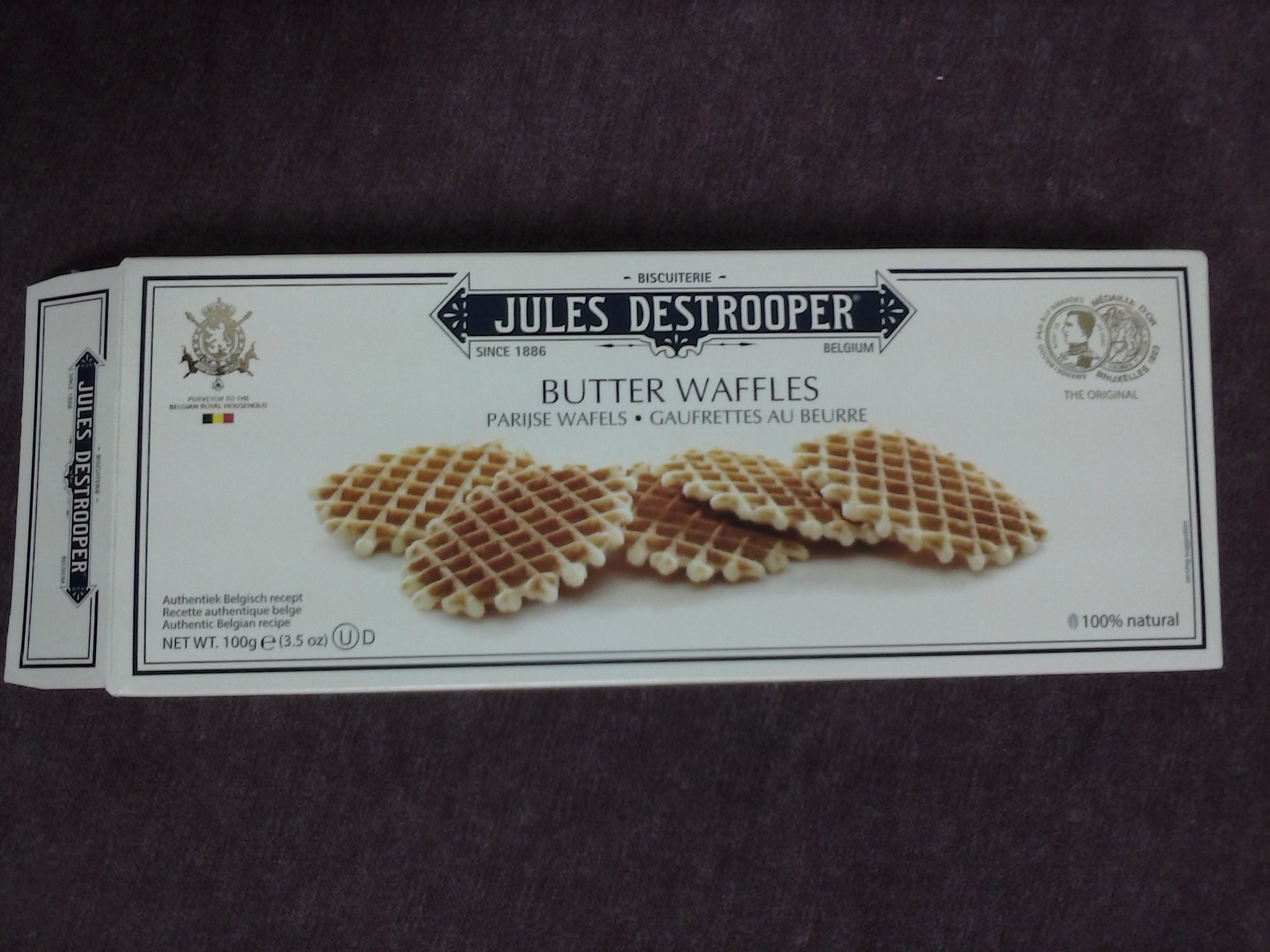
A box of Jules Destrooper butter waffle.

Jules Destrooper is a Belgian food company based in Lo, West Flanders. It was founded in 1886 by Jules Destrooper (1856–1934).

Jules Destrooper produces a range of premium biscuits and is mainly known for its small butterwaffle known as lukken. The company exports products to about 75 countries all over the world and offers private-label production services.

The company was acquired in 2015 by GT&CO, a holding company of the Vandermarliere family.

Jules Destrooper is a royal warrant holder of the Court of Belgium.
