= Rip Van Wafels =

American food manufacturer

Rip Van
- Type: Private
- Industry: Snack Foods
- Founded: 2010
- Founder: Rip Pruisken; Marco De Leon
- Headquarters: Brooklyn, New York
- Area served: United States
- Products: Stroopwafels, wafers, cookies, breakfast bars, fruit snacks
- Website: www.ripvan.com

Rip Van is an American food company that currently manufactures stroopwafels (Rip Van Wafels), wafers (Rip Van Wafers), cookies, and other snacks. The company manufactures stroopwafels, which are two thin waffle pastries melded together with a sweet syrup center.

== History ==
The company was started by two college students at Brown University, Amsterdam-native Rip Pruisken and Marco De Leon, in 2010 from their dorm room. The two used Kickstarter to launch their business, calling their product Van Wafels. The two founders slept in a Volvo station wagon as they drove across the country to deliver their product to stores. They spent two years on campus trying to improve product marketing and the quality of the snack.

The name of the product was inspired by the Washington Irving story Rip Van Winkle. In 2016, the company's founders were included in the 2016 edition of Forbes 30 Under 30 . In November 2020, the product was listed as one of the fastest-growing brands on Amazon within the grocery category.
