= Lukken =

Traditional dessert waffle from West Flanders

- Alternative names: Butter waffles
- Type: Waffle
- Place of origin: West Flanders
- Main ingredients: Flour, butter, eggs, sugar, salt, cognac (or rum, or water)

Lukken are thin dessert waffles, traditionally made in West Flanders to celebrate the New Year and other feasts. Lukken are made with more sugar than other traditional waffles, and since sugar was historically a luxury good, lukken were associated with the nobility and with celebrations. Jules Destrooper popularized a version of lukken called "butter waffles".

== Description ==
The main ingredients in lukken are flour, butter, and sugar. The Westvlaamsch Idioticon, a West Flemish dictionary, defined lukke as a "thin, solid little wafer, usually oval-shaped."

== Etymology ==
The term lukken is derived from the Dutch word for luck, geluk. Traditionally, on New Year's Day, children would congratulate (luk) their godparents by offering lukken. The baking of lukken became idiomatic for something that could be done quickly and simply, as in the Flemish expression Het gaat lijk lukken bakken ("it goes like baking lukken").

In Belgium, lukken are sometimes called nieuwjaarswafeltjes, meaning "New Year waffles". In the Netherlands, lukken goes by names such as ijzerkoekjes and niepertjes.

== History ==
Traditionally, lukken were produced on special "luk irons" (lukijzers) that sometimes became family heirlooms. A museum in Bruges came into possession of one such iron, dating from the 18th century, and bearing the phrase Ik wens u een zalig nieuwjaer ("I wish you a happy New Year").

When electric waffle irons were introduced, the time to bake a single lukken could be reduced from 3 minutes to 30 seconds. The Gazette van Detroit, a newspaper for Belgian Americans, often advertized the sale of lukken irons around the holidays.

Jules Destrooper popularized a version of lukken called "butter waffles".

== See also ==
- Ijzerkoekje
- Pizzelle
- Stroopwafel
