= Caesarsboom =

Very old European yew tree in Belgium

Coordinates: 50.98028°N 2.74554°E

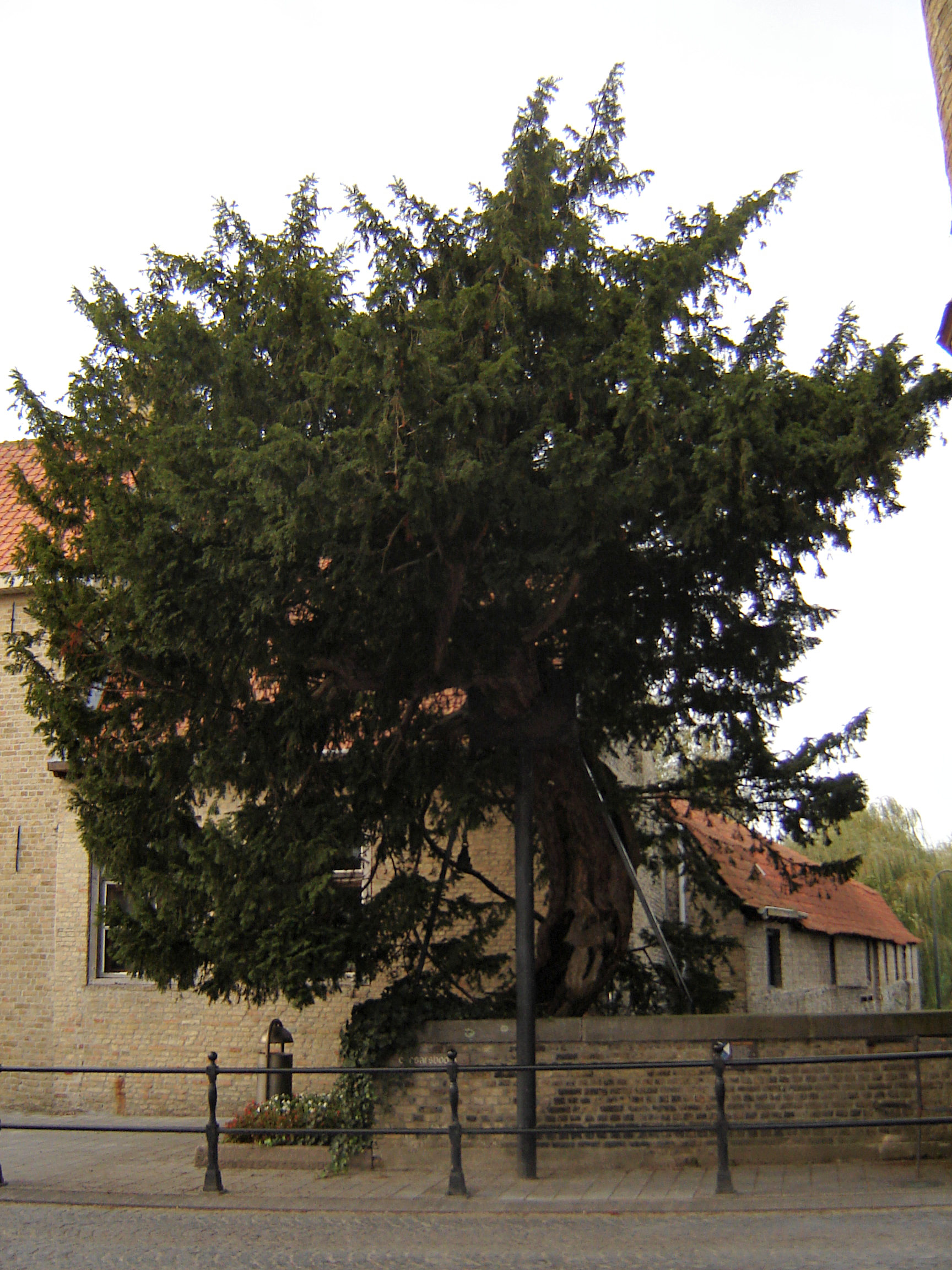
Caesarsboom

Caesarsboom (Caesar's Tree) is a yew tree of about 250 years old. The ancient tree grows in Lo, a town in Lo-Reninge, a municipality of the province of West-Vlaanderen of Belgium. Its species is Taxus baccata, the European Yew. The tree is designated a national monument of Belgium.

According to a long-held local legend, Julius Caesar stopped at this tree during his military campaign in the area en route to Britannia in 55 BC, tied his horse to it, and took a nap in the shadow of its foliage. This led to the belief that the tree is over 2000 years old, though age calculations based on its circumference date it to 200 to 300 years old. According to one source, although the road passing by the tree might date from the era of Imperial Rome, it is not likely that Julius Caesar came to this area.

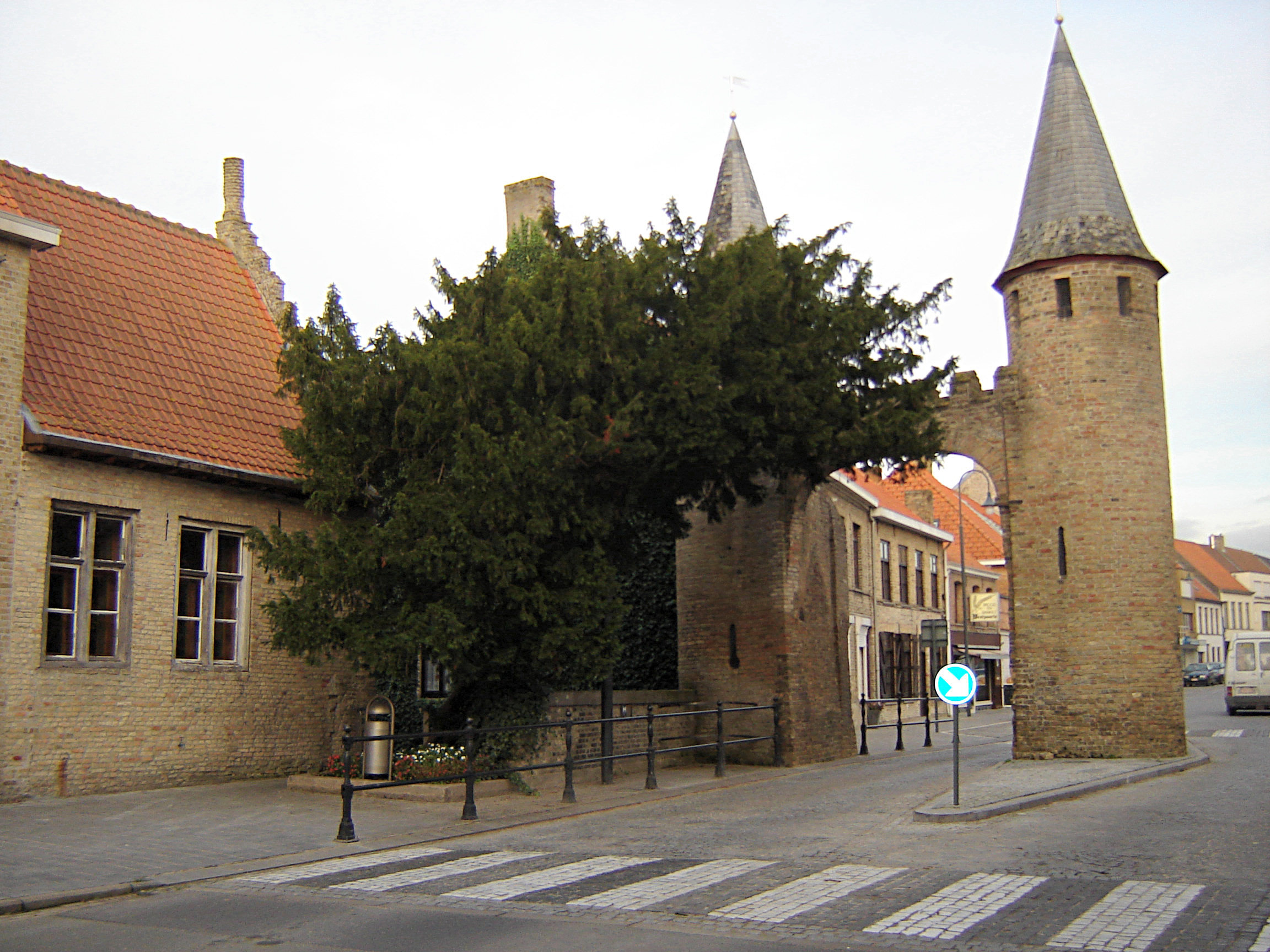
Caesarsboom and city gate

The tree grows beside the last extant city gate, of four medieval arches built in the 14th century (and restored both in 1852 and 1991); at the time the town was less than 400 meters in diameter. Caesarsboom stands adjacent to a house called "Het Damberd" ("The Draught-board House") which written sources from 1499 show once housed the oldest of the four breweries which used to exist in the town of Lo.

== See also ==
- List of individual trees
