= Old Town Hall, Lo =

UNESCO World Heritage Site
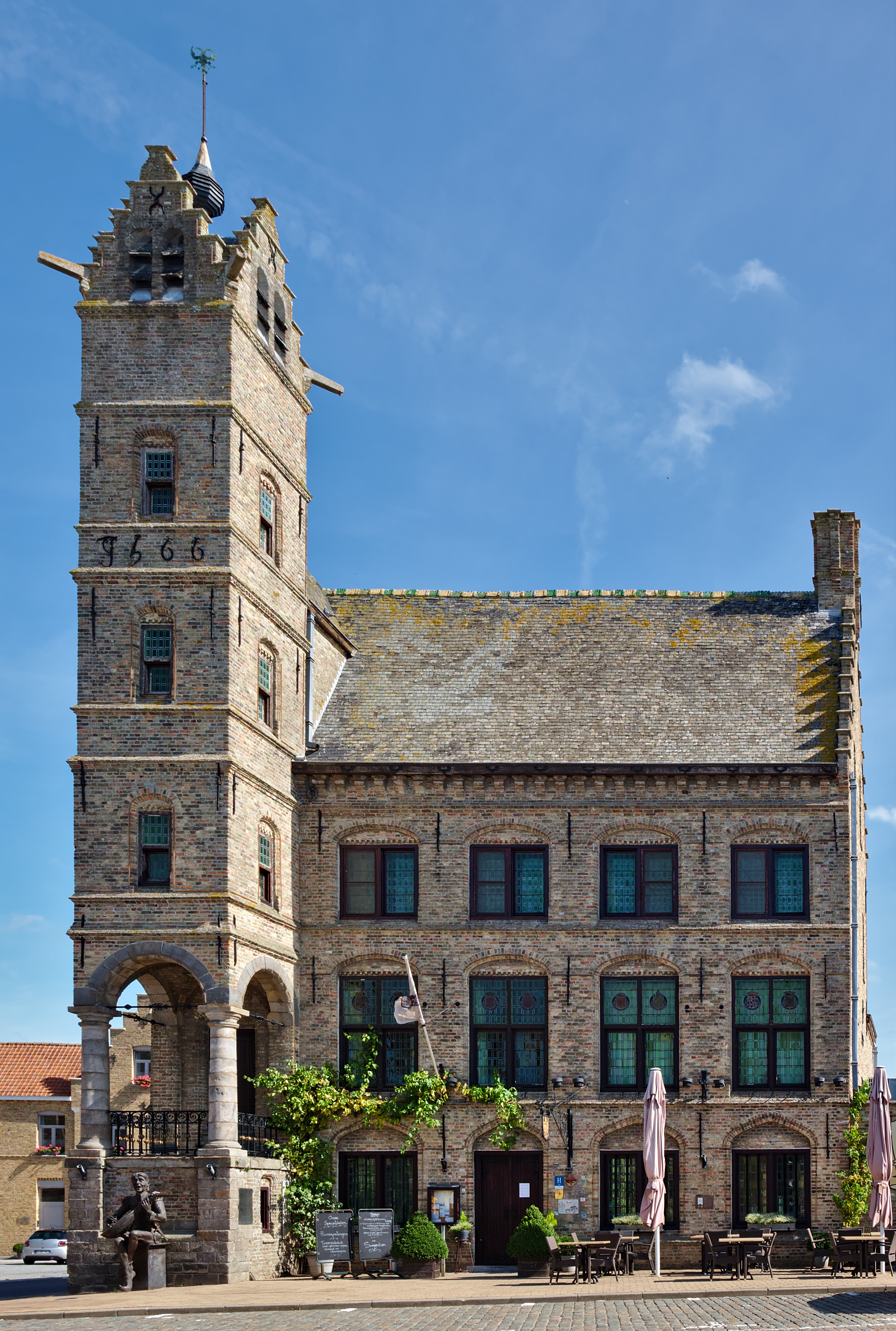
- Old town hall and belfry

- Location within Belgium
- Official name: Voormalig Stadhuis met Belfort (Former Town Hall with Belfry)
- Location: Lo-Reninge, West Flanders, Flemish Region, Belgium
- Part of: Belfries of Belgium and France
- Criteria: Cultural: (ii), (iv)
- Reference: 943bis-014
- Inscription: 1999 (23rd Session)
- Extensions: 2005
- Area: 0.086 ha (0.21 acres)
- Buffer zone: 19.05 ha (47.1 acres)
- Coordinates: 50°58′50″N 2°44′49″E

The Old Town Hall of Lo is a historic landmark in the municipality of Lo-Reninge, in the Belgian province of West Flanders. Formerly the seat of the municipal government, the building is now a hotel and restaurant.

The hall was built in 1565-1566 in Renaissance style by Joos Staesin from Ypres, in replacement of an older, dilapidated town hall. At the corner of the building is a belfry tower, supported in the front by two Tuscan columns. The four walls at the top the tower end in step gables, with louvered openings to let out sound from the bell chamber. The lower part of the tower, with round arches over the columns, encloses a platform from which proclamations were announced. On the middle of the building's three main stories, a distinctly Flemish dining hall has been preserved, with an elegant mantelpiece, oaken ceiling and old windows glazed with the coats of arms of nobles and clergymen.

In 1999, the hall and the belfry were inscribed on the UNESCO World Heritage List as part of the Belfries of Belgium and France site, because of its Renaissance architecture and its testimony to the civic (not religious) influence and its impmortance in the granting of civil liberties.
