= Lo-Reninge =

- City and municipality
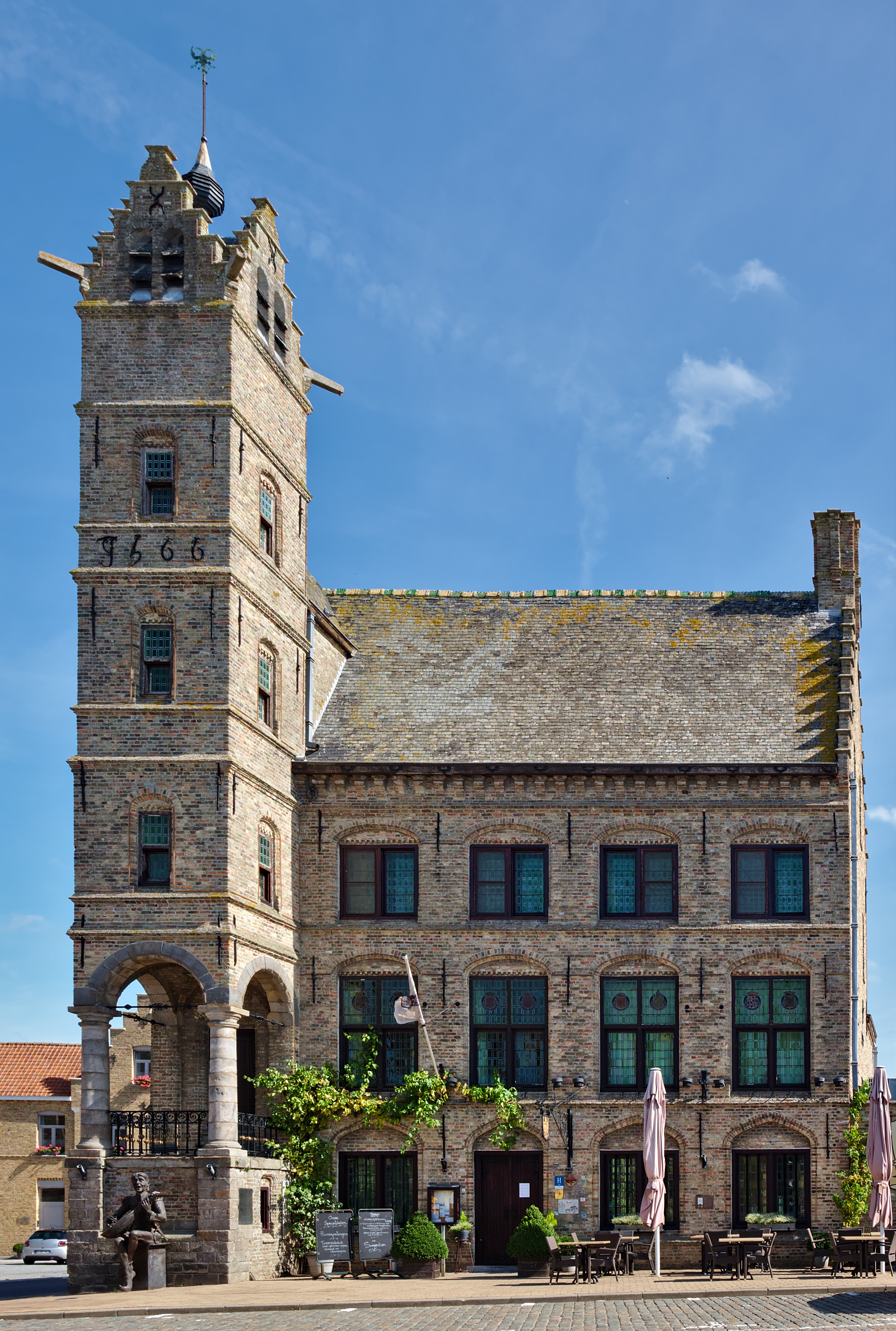
- Old town hall and Belfry of Lo

- Flag Coat of arms

- Location of Lo-Reninge in West Flanders
- Interactive map of Lo-Reninge
- Location in Belgium
- Coordinates: 50°59′N 02°45′E
- Country: Belgium
- Community: Flemish Community
- Region: Flemish Region
- Province: West Flanders
- Arrondissement: Diksmuide

Government
  - Mayor: Lieve Castryck (Dynamisch)
  - Governing party: Dynamisch

Area
  - Total: 63.4 km^{2} (24.5 sq mi)

Population (2018-01-01)
  - Total: 3,289
  - Density: 51.9/km^{2} (134/sq mi)
- Postal codes: 8647
- NIS code: 32030
- Area codes: 058
- Website: www.lo-reninge.be

Lo-Reninge (Dutch pronunciation: [ˌloːˈreːnɪŋə]; West Flemish: Lo-Rênienge) is a municipality and city located in the Belgian province of West Flanders. The municipality comprises the towns of Lo, Noordschote, Pollinkhove and Reninge. On January 1, 2006, Lo-Reninge had a total population of 3,306. The total area is 62.94 km^{2} which gives a population density of 53 inhabitants per km^{2}. The Old Town Hall of Lo, built between 1565 and 1566, and its belfry were inscribed on the UNESCO World Heritage List in 1999 as part of the Belfries of Belgium and France site.

It is the birthplace of Flemish painter Jacques-Albert Senave.

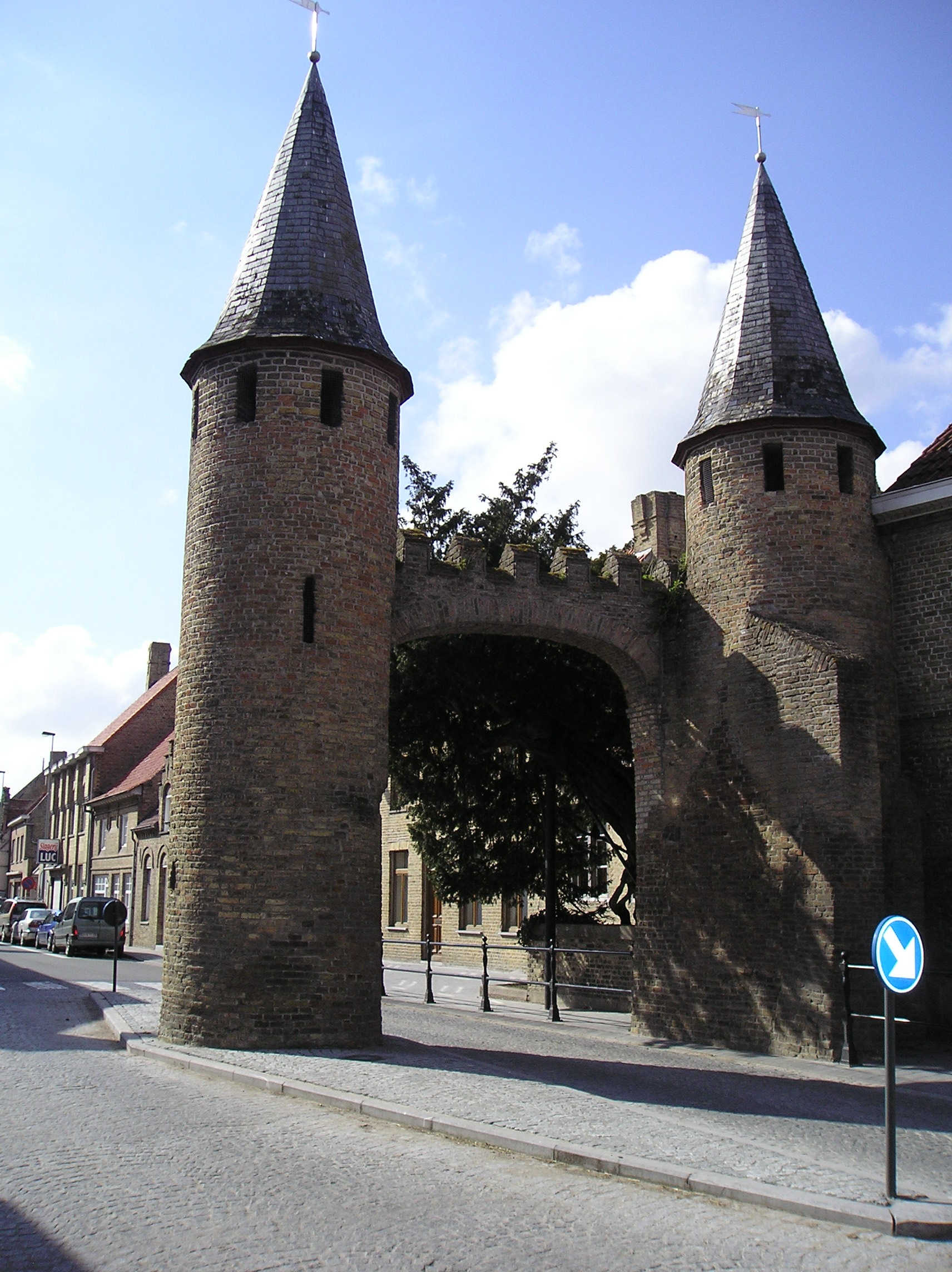
The 13th century city wall of Lo, with the Caesar's Tree behind it.

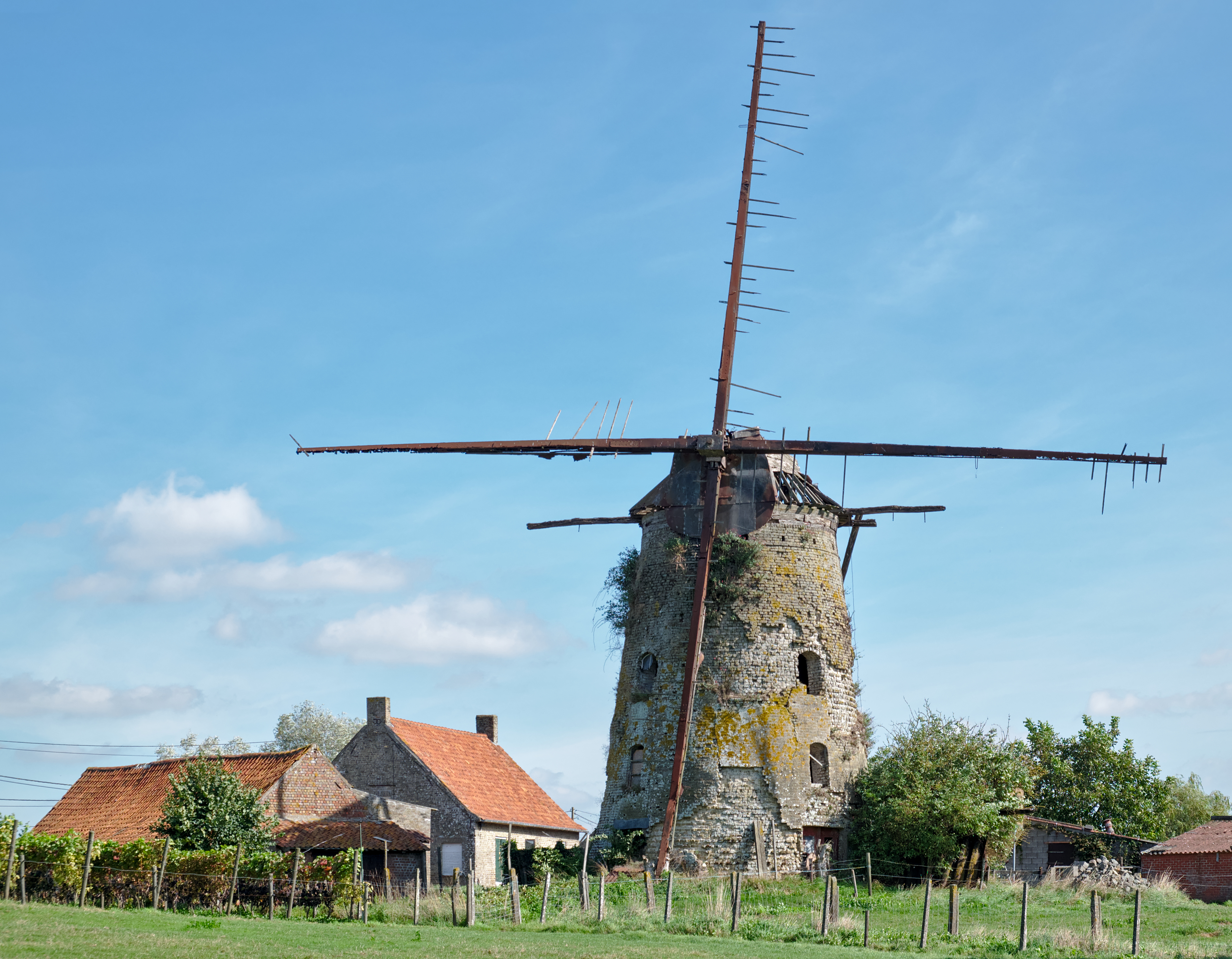
The Margriet windmill

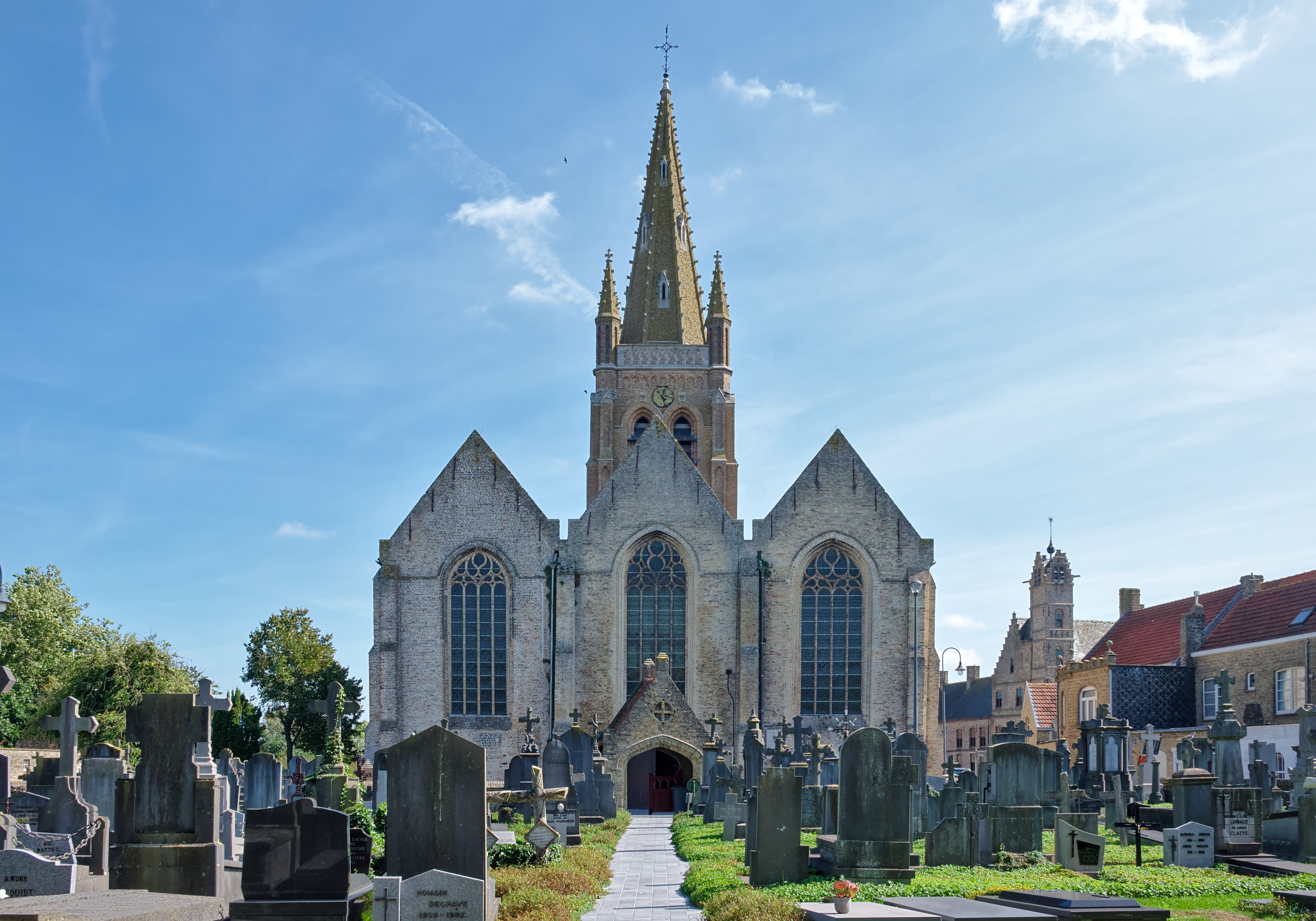
Sint-Pieter's church in Lo
