= Jacques-Albert Senave =

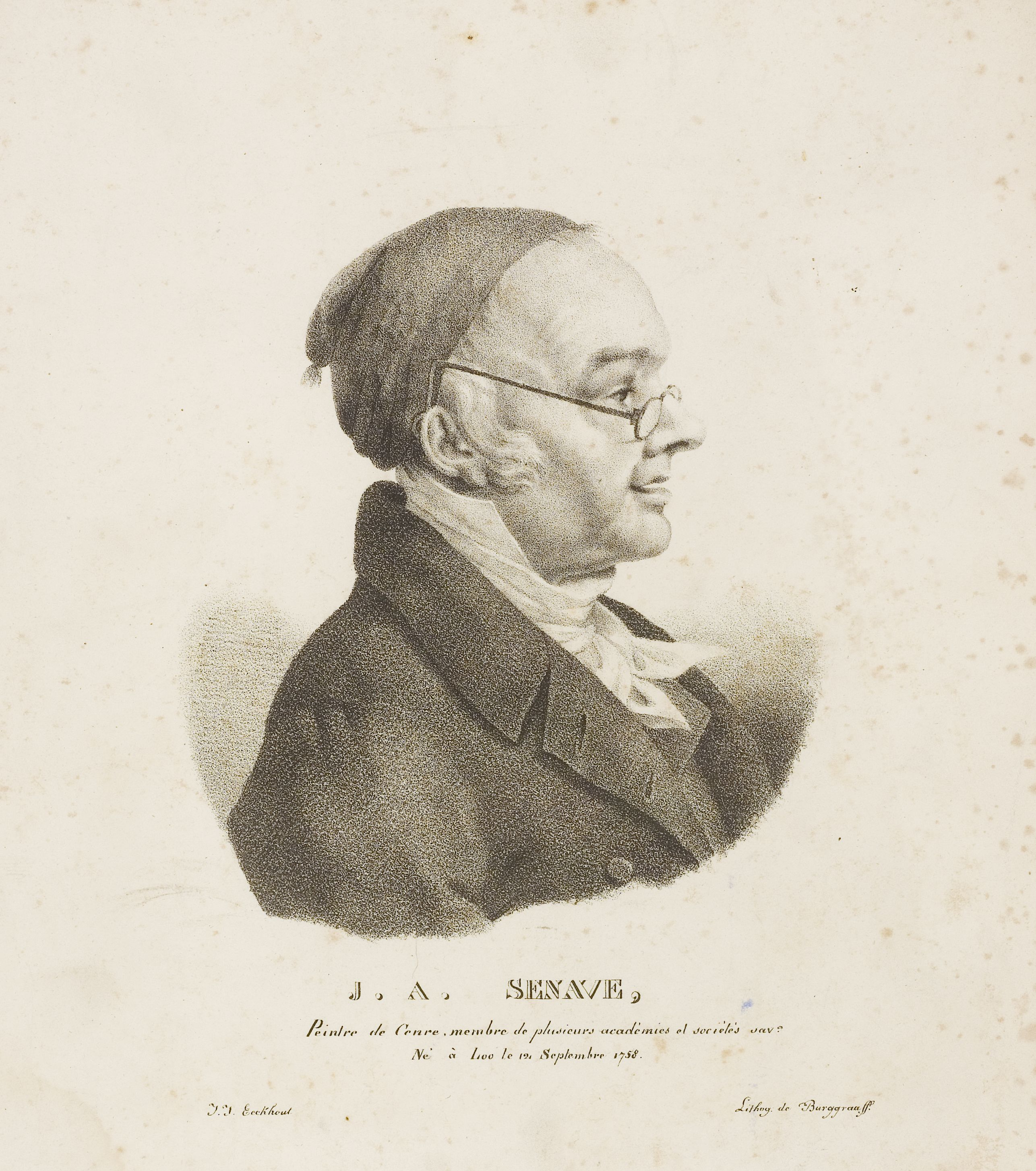
Jacques-Albert Senave

Jacques-Albert Senave (1758–1823) was a Flemish painter mainly active in Paris during the late 18th and early 19th centuries. He is known for his genre scenes, history paintings, landscapes, city views, market scenes and portraits.

== Early Life, Education, and Career in Paris ==
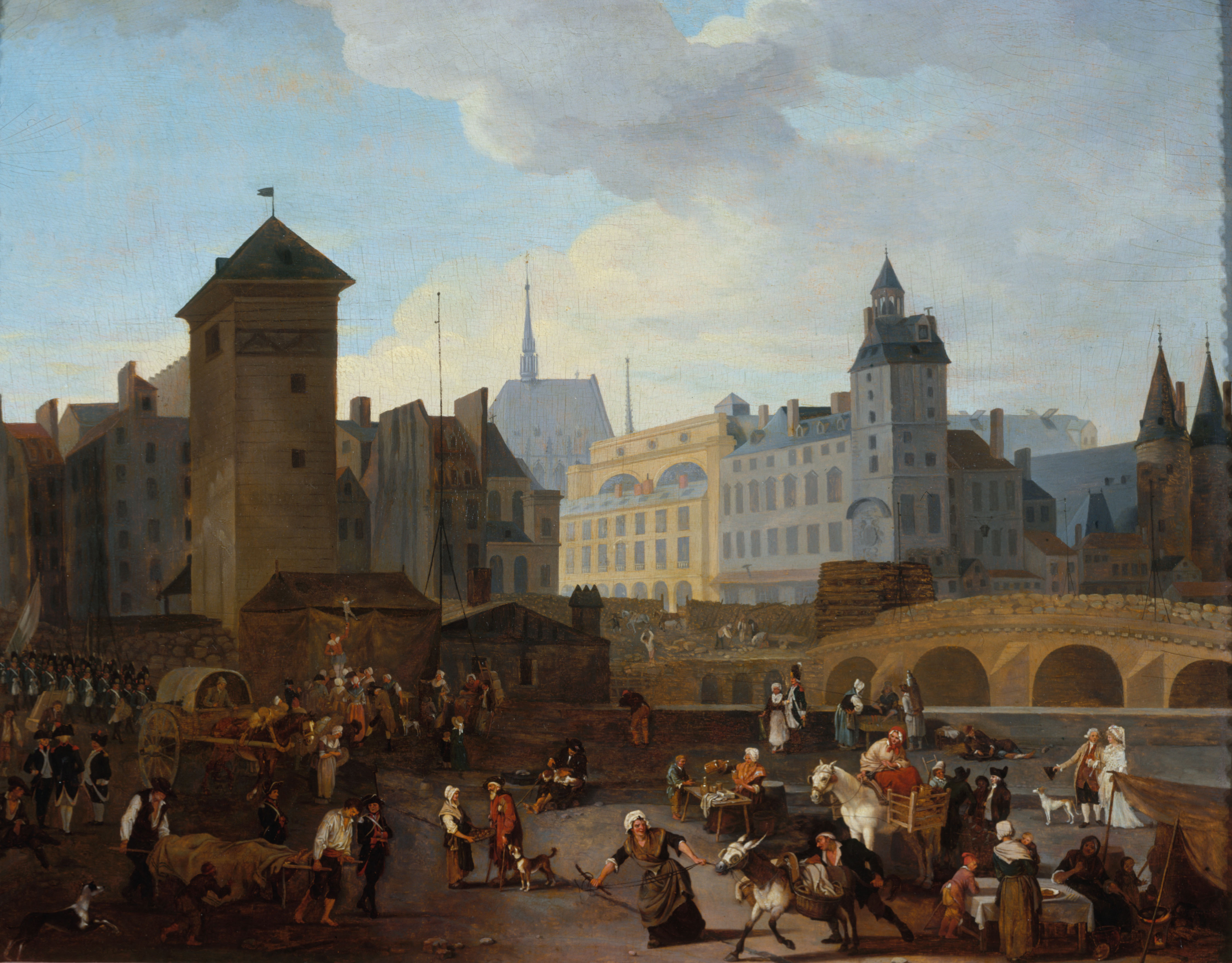
The Palace and the Notre-Dame Pump seen from the Pelletier quay

=== Early Training in Loo ===
Born to a baker on 12 September 1758 in Loo, in the Austrian Netherlands (modern day Lo, Belgium), Senave began taking artistic training under Canon Hennequin, at the Augustinian abbey of his native town.

=== Further Training in Dunkirk and Saint-Omer ===
At the age of 15, Senave entered the Academy of Dunkirk in 1773. During his time in Dunkirk, he balanced his academic time by spending his days assisting in a bakery to support himself, and practicing his art at the academy in the evenings. Over time, as he had to spend more time working in the bakery, his art studies suffered and he returned to live with his parents. He was able to resume his studies in Dunkirk with the financial support of M. Truit, who was one of his teachers at the academy, who recognised Senave's talent. This allowed Senave to study full-time at Dunkrirk. After graduating, Senave later continued his studies at the Academies of Saint-Omer, where Truit had been appointed a teacher at the local school of drawing . After a year in Saint-Omer, Canon Hennequin procured for him a commission to decorate a pavilion in his hometown Lo, which Hennequin (who was also an architect) had designed for a local family.

=== Move to Paris and Ypres ===
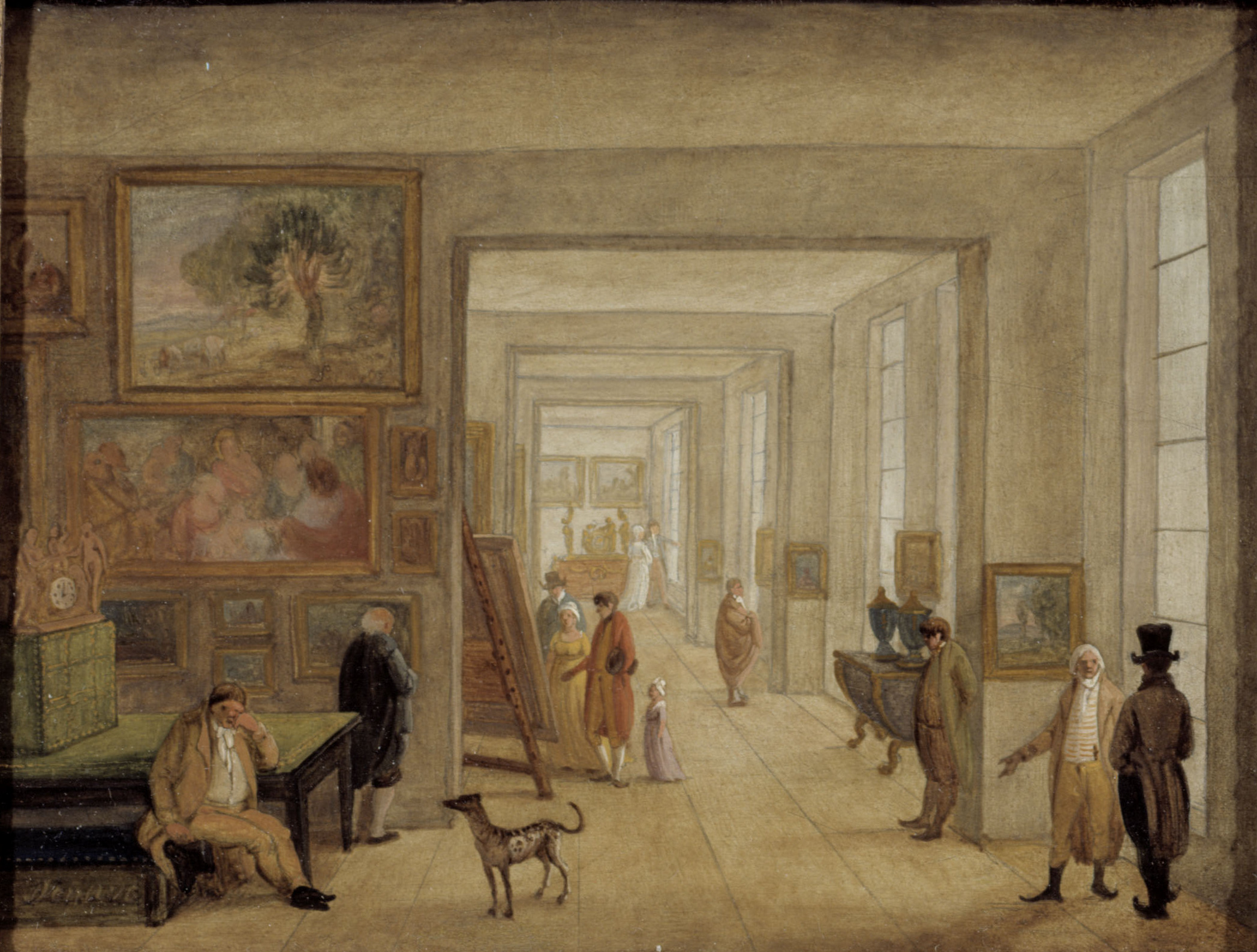
Sales rooms at the Elysée Palace in Paris in 1797

The money earned from this commission allowed Senave to travel to Paris in 1780. He continued his studies at the Académie royale de peinture et de sculpture for a few months until his money ran out. He returned to his hometown where he worked on local commissions for religious institutions and local dignitaries. Through contacts of his patron the abbot Hennequin, he was admitted as a student in the Academy of Ypres. In Ypres, Senave was also introduced to prominent art lovers. The bishop of Ypres Felix Josephus Hubertus de Wavrans became his patron. Senave painted portraits and other subjects for the bishop.

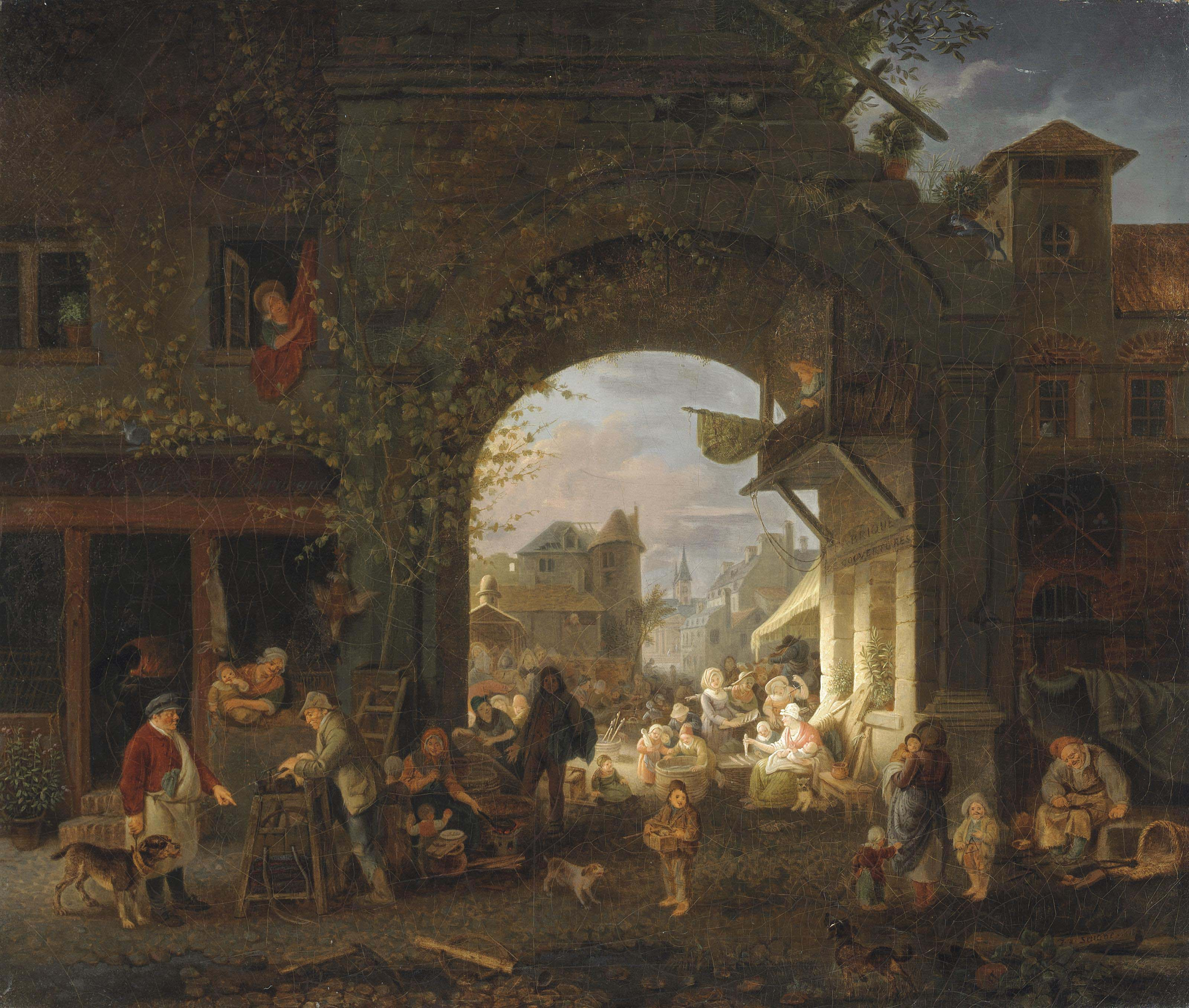
Market day

His earnings allowed him to return to the Académie royale de peinture et de sculpture in Paris where he obtained third prize in drawing and later second prize in life drawing. In Paris he also received training from his fellow Flemish painter Joseph-Benoît Suvée. Senave started selling small genre paintings in the Flemish style which earned him some success.

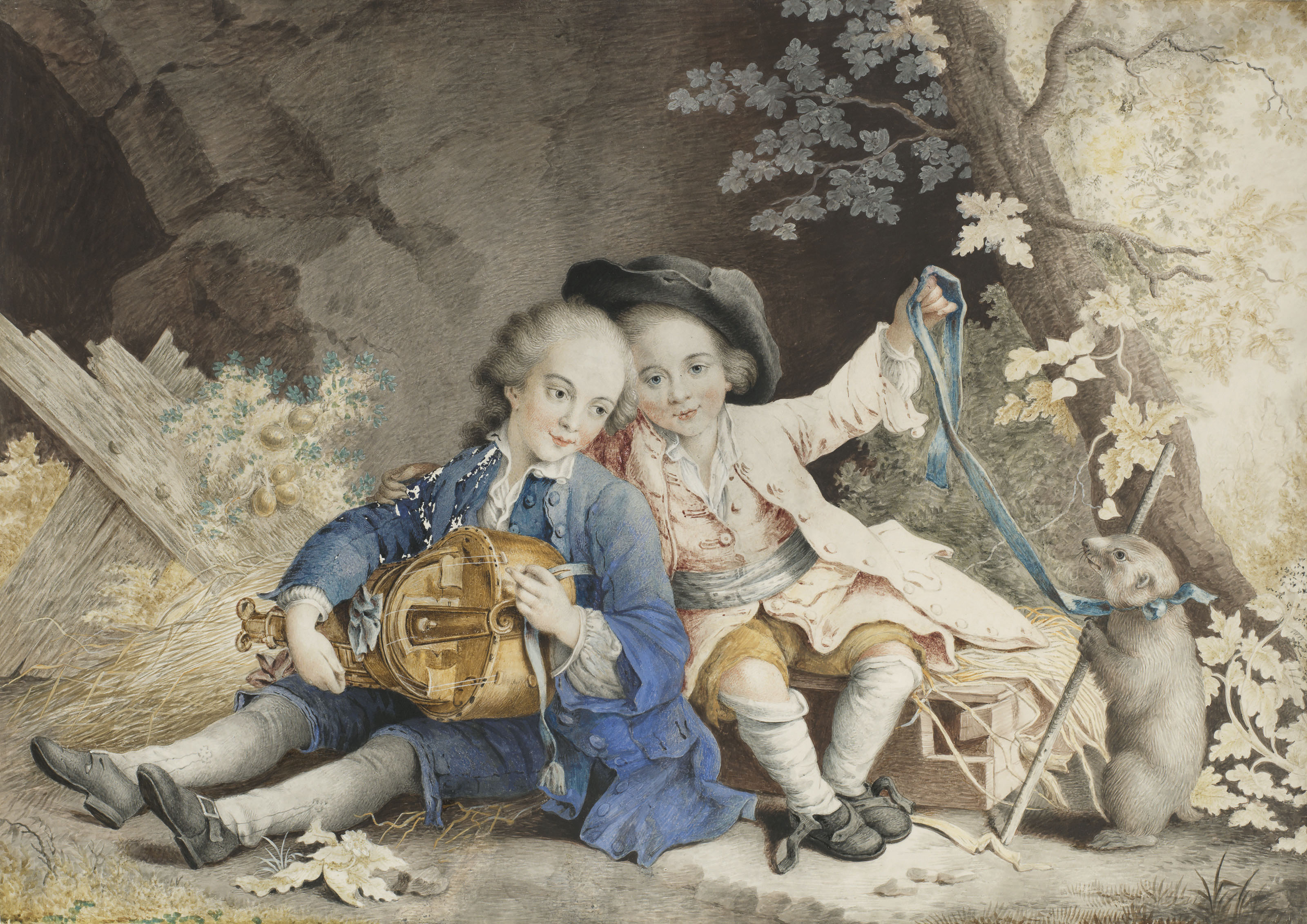
Hurdy-gurdy player and performer with a marmot

=== Salon Exhibitions ===
He developed an interest in poetry and wrote poems in French and Dutch. He regularly contributed his paintings to the Salons in Paris.

After donating to the Painting Academy of Ypres a painting depicting Rembrandt in his workshop (destroyed during World War I), Senave was appointed Honorary Director of the Academy in 1821. His donated work formed the beginning of the art collection of the City Museum of Ypres. He also received the honor of being made an honorary member of the Royal Society of Fine Arts and Literature of Ghent.

== Personal life ==
On 19 May 1789, Jacques-Albert Senave married Marguerite Martin in Paris (Saint-André-des-Arts). They had a son who followed in his father's footsteps and became a painter. At the age of 22, their son died, and as a result of the grief over this early death, Senave's wife died not long after. In his later years, Senave's right side of his body became paralyzed, forcing him to learn how to draw with his left hand, however, he was unable to paint. He later married a second time with the woman who took care of him during his final years. Senave died in Paris in 1823.

== Work ==
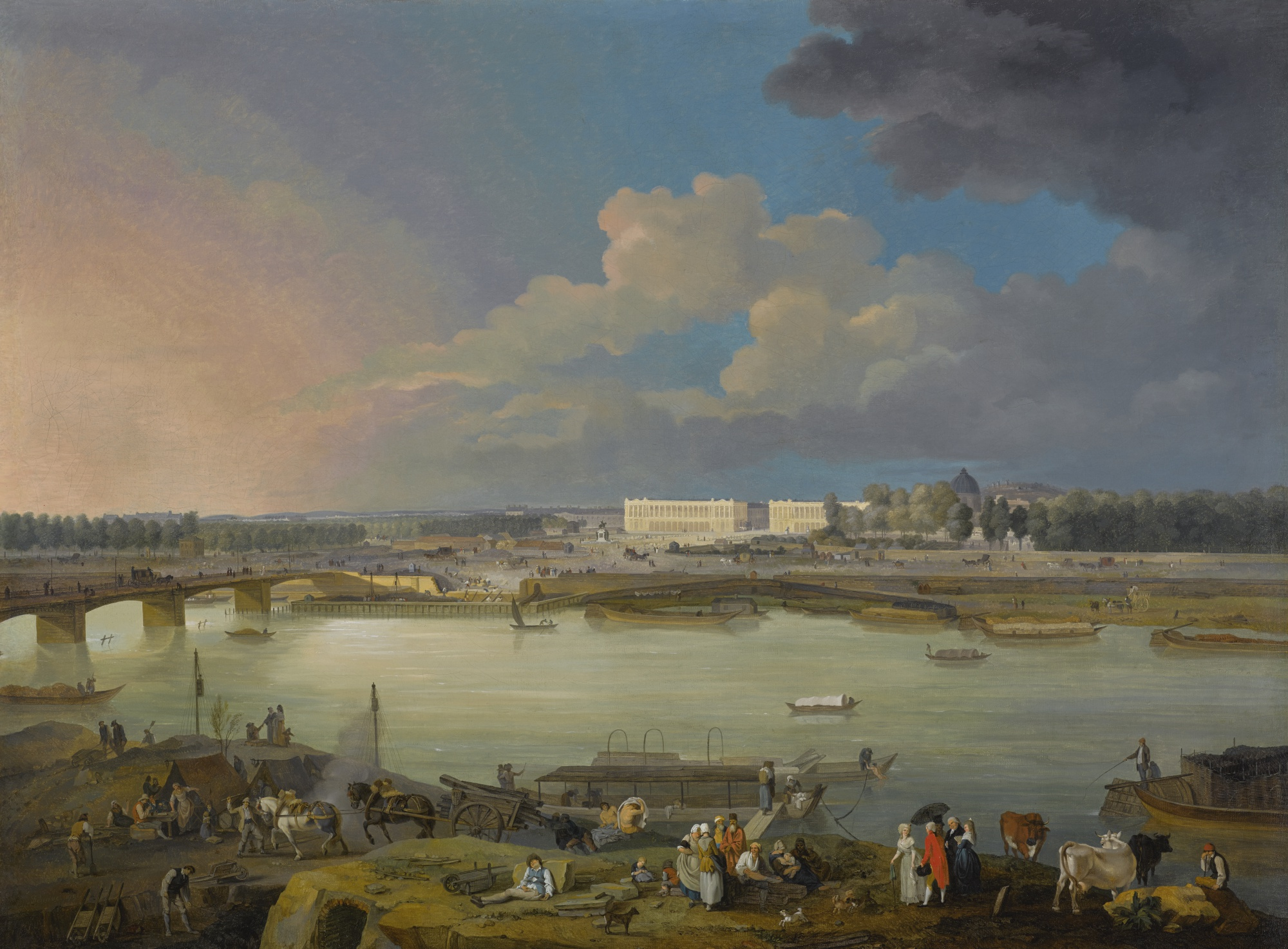
Paris, a view of the Seine with the bridge of Louis XVI

Senave is known for his genre scenes, history paintings, landscapes, city views, market scenes, portraits and some still lifes. His genre paintings were strongly influenced by seventeenth century Flemish and Dutch genre scenes. These are particularly reminiscent of David Teniers the Younger's tavern and festival scenes. He excelled especially in anecdotal representations of daily life, market scenes, village views.

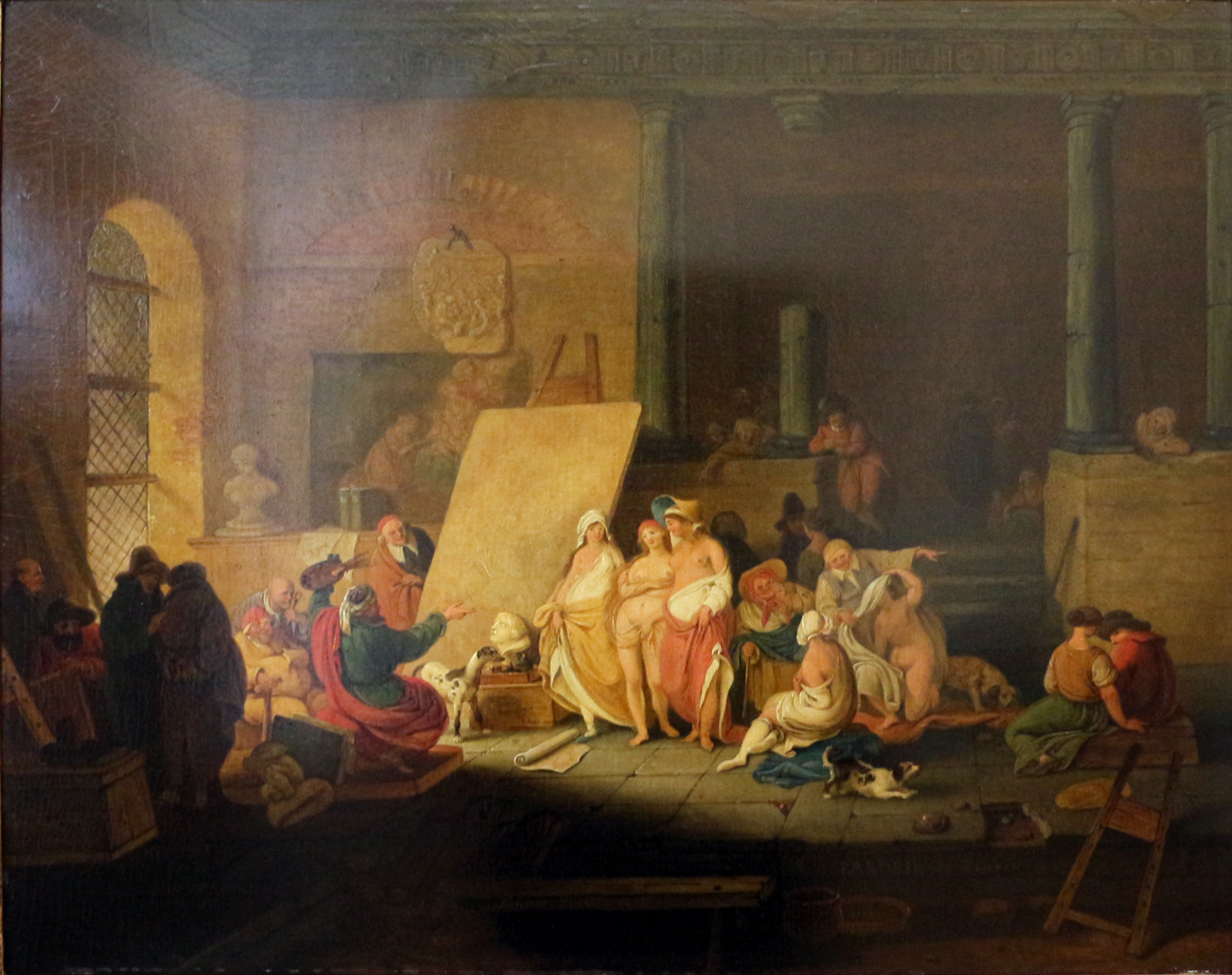
Parody of Zeuxis

Senave painted two versions of a work entitled Parody of Zeuxis (Royal Museums of Fine Arts of Belgium, Brussels and City Museum of Ypres) which are a parody on a legend about the Greek painter Zeuxis who flourished during the 5th century BCE. The story as recounted by Cicero states that Zeuxis received a commission to paint a portrait of Helen of Troy for the Temple of Jupiter at Crotona. To realise the commission Zeuxis set out to find the most perfect characteristics from five of the greatest beauties of the city. In Senave's painting in the Royal Museums of Fine Arts of Belgium, the artist is shown sitting in a cavernous space with a large canvas in front of him while he is inspecting prospective models in various states of undress. An old lady behind the models looks like a procuress, which suggests that in fact the models are prostitutes and the room is a brothel. This impression is further bolstered by the pair of lovers huddled furtively on the right side. Some suspicious figures are gathered in the shadow on the far left, one of whom is holding a painting. Art historian Elizabeth Mansfield has described the dog standing in front of Zeuxis as misshapen and a likely product of the same method of selecting and combining traits of dogs as Zeuxis intended to use with his models. The method clearly did not produce an example of ideal beauty. Mansfield writes that the painting "humorously exposes the circuit of aesthetic-erotic-commercial traffic embedded within the Zeuxis myth".

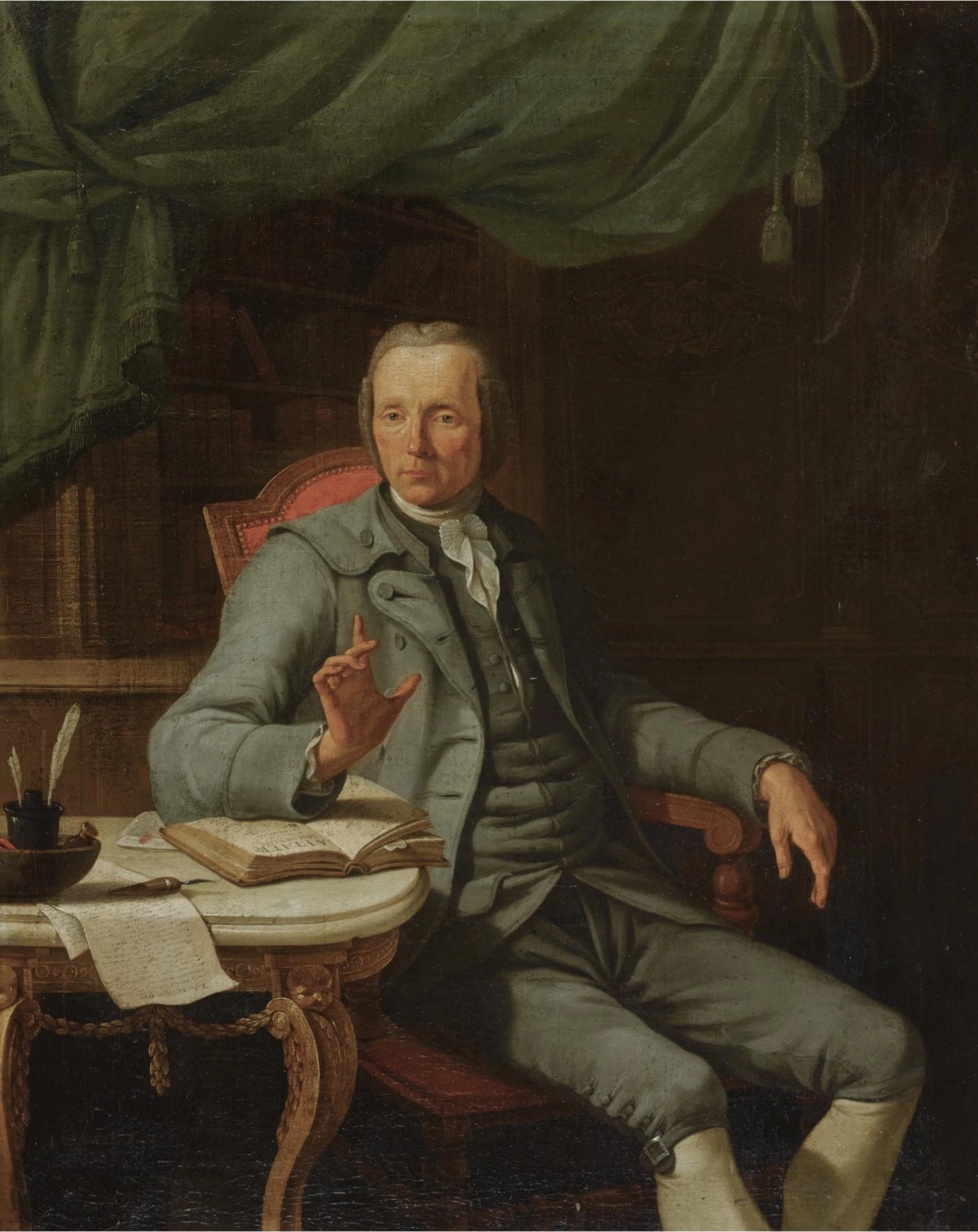
Portrait of a 48-year old gentleman

Senave painted religiously themed works such as the Seven Works of Mercy created for the Saint Peter's church in his hometown Lo. He only painted a few portraits. An example is the Portrait of a 48-year old gentleman (Sotheby's Amsterdam 5 May 2009, lot 101). It shows the unidentified sitter seated in his study with his right arm resting on a book on a small table. The book tells something about the sitter's beliefs: it is didactic poem, Altaergeheimnissen (Dutch for 'Secrets of the Altar') first published 1645 in which the Catholic convert Joost van den Vondel expounded the doctrine of the Eucharist.
