= IJzerkoekje =

Soft cookie from the Netherlands baked on a checkered iron plate

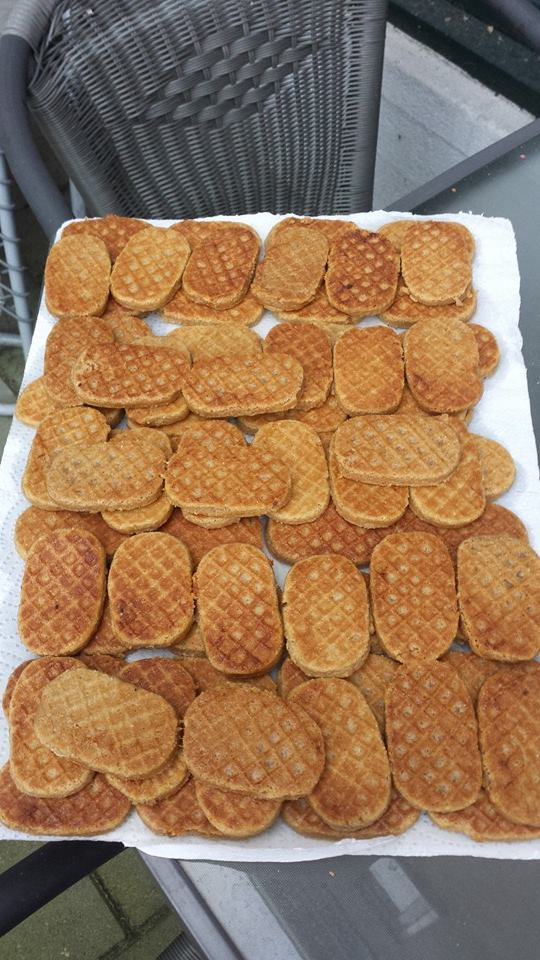
- IJzerkoekjes on display
- Place of origin: Netherlands

An ijzerkoekje (Dutch pronunciation: [ˈɛizərˌkukjə], 'iron cookie') is a soft cookie, traditionally eaten by Dutch fishermen, especially in Vlaardingen, one of the main harbours of the Netherlands during the 19th and 20th centuries. It is an oval cookie around 0.6–0.7 cm (0.24–0.28 in) thick with a cinnamon 'creamy' taste. The cookies were invented in the city of Vlaardingen and are baked on a checkered iron plate, creating a characteristic waffle-like pattern, similar to stroopwafels.

== Origin ==
According to oral history, the grocer "Daatje de Koe" (1838–1915) made the first Vlaardingse iron cookies. Afterwards, the product was introduced in the assortment of various city bakers.

Research of the Vlaardingen baker Hazenberg in regional archives showed that the cookie is probably older and dates from the 18th century. They were popular among fisherman for their caloric-density and longevity.

Today, most pastry shops in Vlaardingen sell ijzerkoekjes. Also, special waffle irons are available as well as ijzerkoekje flour for baking the cookies at home.

== Sri Lanka ==
In Sri Lanka, these biscuits are also known under the name ijzerkoekje. These are considered to be local cuisine. This variety originated within the Burgher community, an ethnically mixed population group, with partly European ancestors, including the Dutch Burghers. The cookies are called 'ijzer' or 'ijzer koekje' and are made with wheat flour, sugar, egg, coconut milk, cinnamon, cloves and salt. Butter or oil is only used to grease the baking iron. The iron biscuits are rolled around a 1–1.5 cm (0.4–0.6 in) diameter stick immediately after baking. According to the book Sweet Treats around the World, they are related to Dutch stroopwafels, though stroopwafels are larger, contain syrup and relatively more flour and are baked in a waffle iron.

== See also ==
- Lukken – Traditional dessert waffle from West Flanders
- Stroopwafel – Dutch cookie with caramel filling
