= Noordschote =

Coordinates: 50°57′N 2°49′E

Noordschote is a town in Lo-Reninge, a part of Belgium.
