= Stroopwafel =

Dutch cookie with caramel filling

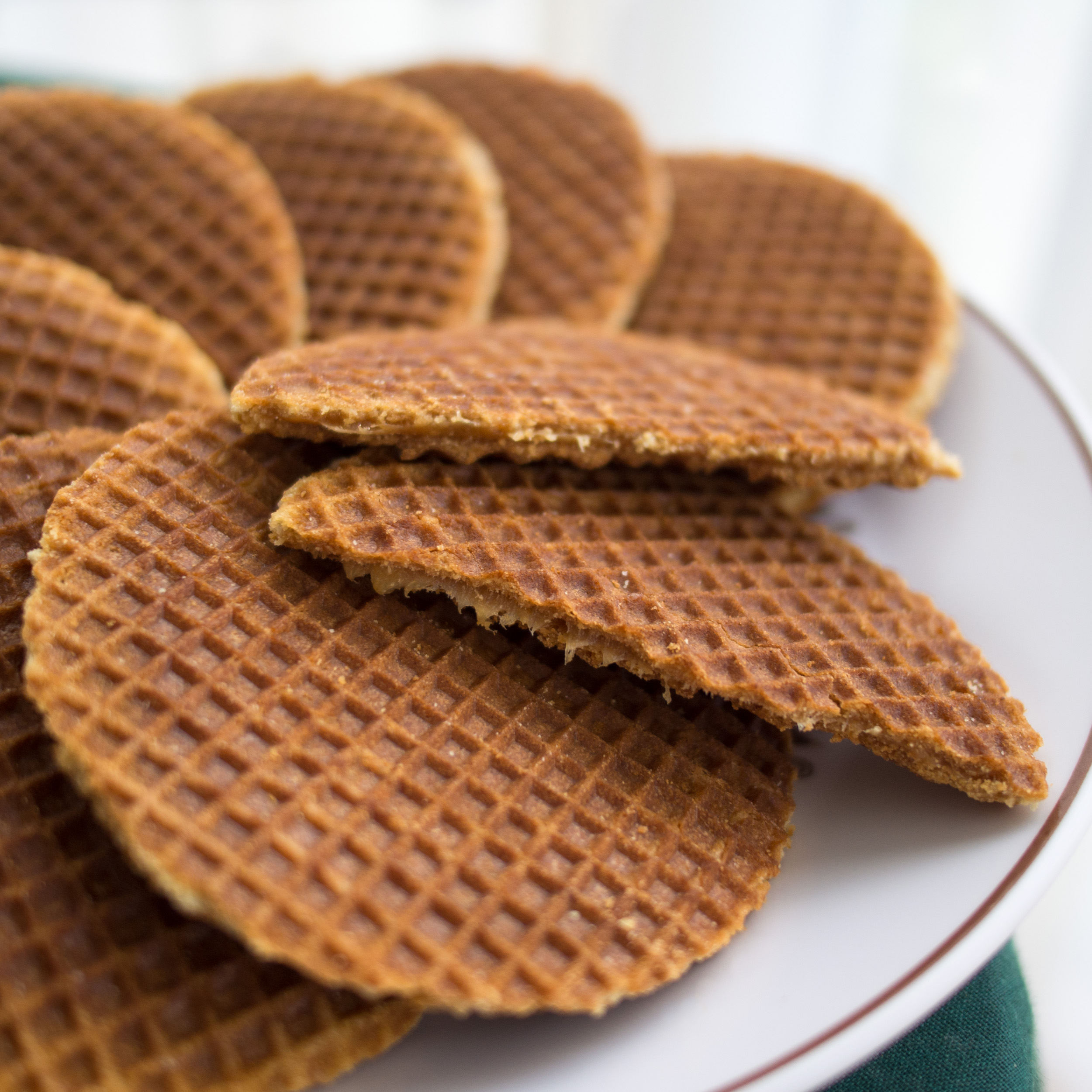
- A plate of stroopwafels
- Alternative names: Syrup waffle, treacle waffle, caramel waffle
- Type: Waffle
- Place of origin: South Holland
- Created by: Gerard Kamphuisen
- Main ingredients: Batter: flour, butter, brown sugar, yeast, milk, eggs Filling: syrup, brown sugar, butter, cinnamon

A stroopwafel (Dutch pronunciation: [ˈstroːpˌʋaːfəl]; lit. 'syrup waffle') is a thin, round biscuit made from two layers of sweet baked dough held together by a treacle/syrup filling, often caramel. First made in the city of Gouda in South Holland, stroopwafels are a well-known Dutch treat popular throughout the Netherlands.

== Description ==
The wafers of a stroopwafel are made from a stiff dough of flour, butter, brown sugar, yeast, milk, and eggs that has been pressed in a hot waffle iron until crisp. (Note: Historically waffles had a diameter of about 10 centimetres (3.9 in), but they are now available in sizes varying between 5 and 25 centimetres (2.0 and 9.8 in).) While still warm, the waffles have their edges removed with a cookie cutter, which allows the remaining disc to be easily separated into top and bottom wafers. A filling made from treacle/syrup, brown sugar, butter, and cinnamon (also warm) is spread between the wafers before the waffle is reassembled. However, many modern-day stores (especially outside of The Netherlands) may use a more common caramel mix. The filling sets as it cools, thereby binding the waffle halves together. The edge cuttings are not discarded but sold separately in a paper bag.

== Etymology ==
In Dutch, stroopwafel is a compound word literally translating to "syrup-waffle". In English, the Dutch term is commonly used verbatim, although the translated "syrup waffle" is sometimes used, "waffle" itself being a loan word from Dutch. In Australia, the cookies are sometimes called "coffee toppers", in reference to the practice of placing them atop hot or warm beverages to warm the cookie and soften the syrup.

== History ==
According to Dutch culinary folklore, stroopwafels were first made in Gouda either during the late 18th century or the early 19th century by bakers repurposing scraps and crumbs by sweetening them with syrup. One story ascribes the invention of the stroopwafel to the baker Gerard Kamphuisen, which would date the first stroopwafels from somewhere between 1810, the year he opened his bakery, and 1840, the year of the oldest known recipe.

After 1870, stroopwafels began to appear in other cities, and in the 20th century, factory-made stroopwafels were introduced. By 1960, there were 17 factories in Gouda alone, of which four are still open. Today, stroopwafels are sold at markets, by street vendors, and in supermarkets worldwide. They are served as a breakfast snack by United Airlines; and were used as a technical challenge on a 2017 episode of The Great British Bake Off.

== Variants ==
Cookies similar to the stroopwafel may be found in parts of the Netherlands. Wafers with honey instead of syrup are sold as honingwafels, and cookies with a syrup are sold as stroopkoeken. Crumbs of stroopwafels (trimmings from manufacturing) are also sold as koekkruimels in candy cones.

A thin wafer with a sugar filling is widely known in northern France, particularly in Lille. This local waffle is known as the gaufre fourrée lilloise, which consists of two thin wafer waffles filled with cassonade sugar and vanilla. A recipe for such a waffle with vanilla filling first appeared in 1849, in the workshop of the renowned patisserie, Maison Méert, from Lille. Waffles with a filling date back to the Middle Ages, as the famous guidebook for married women, Le Ménagier de Paris, compiled in 1393, already includes recipes of waffles with a cheese filling.

== Gallery ==
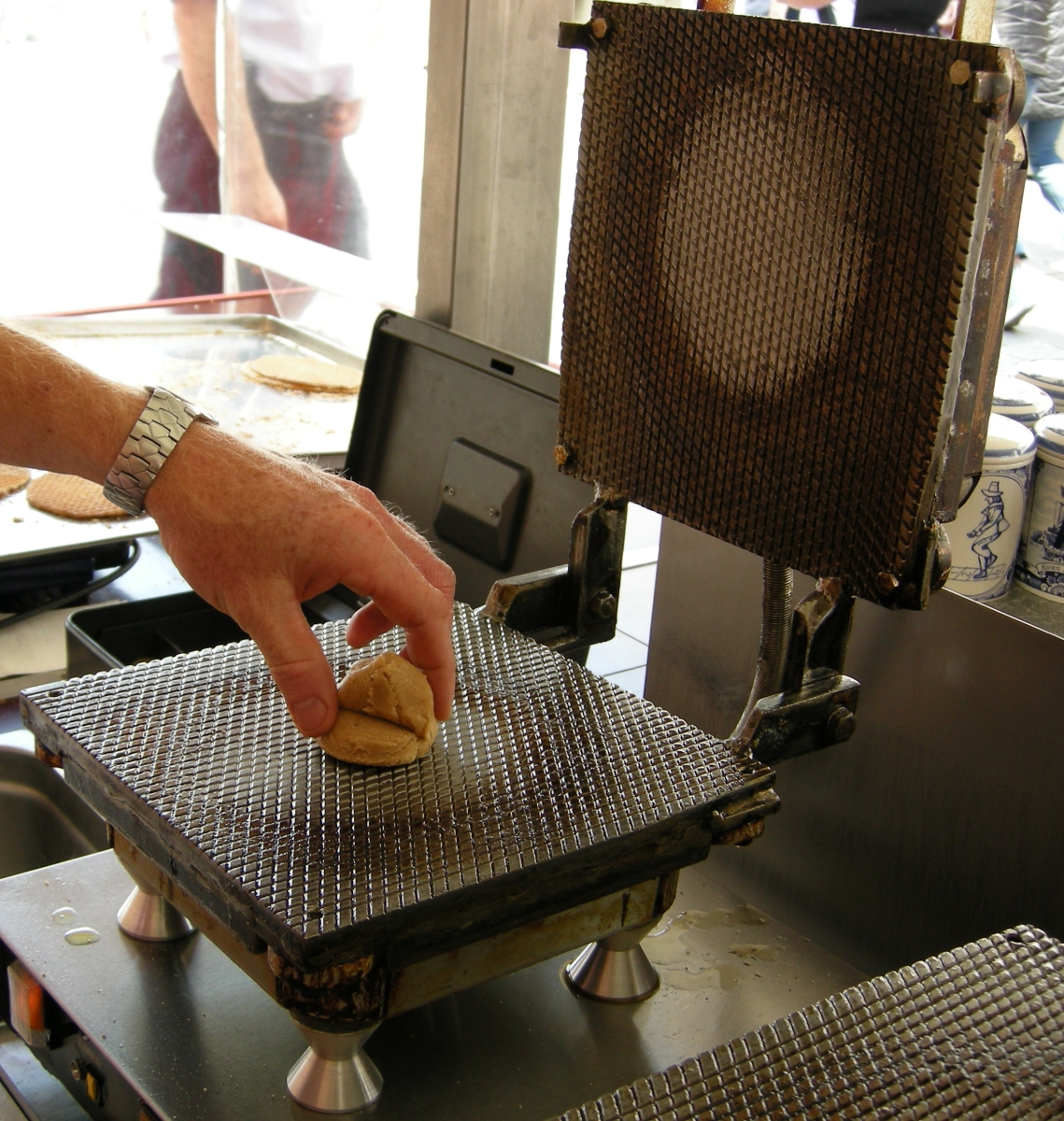
A ball of dough is placed on a waffle iron to make the waffle for a stroopwafel.

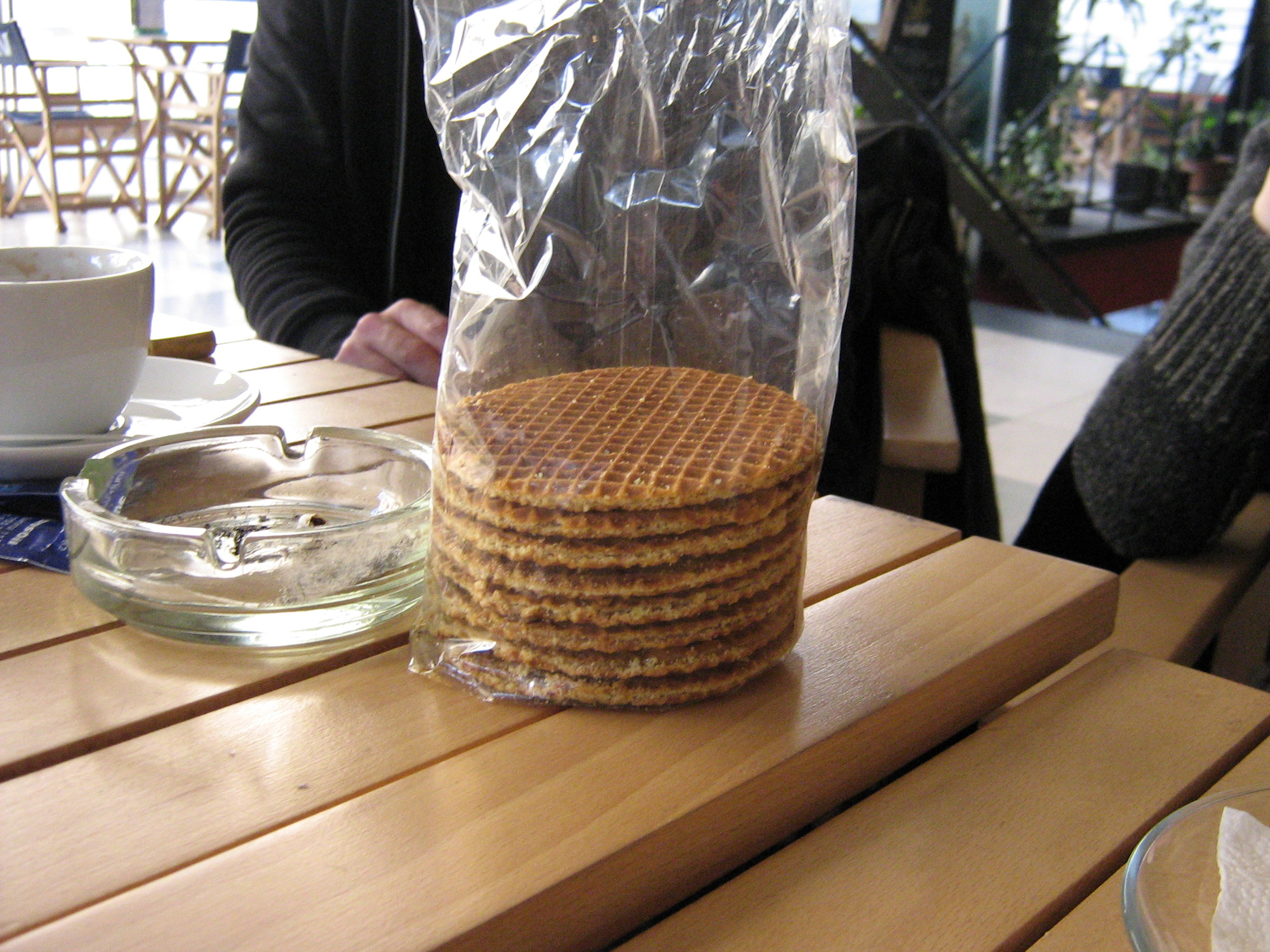
A packet of store-bought stroopwafels

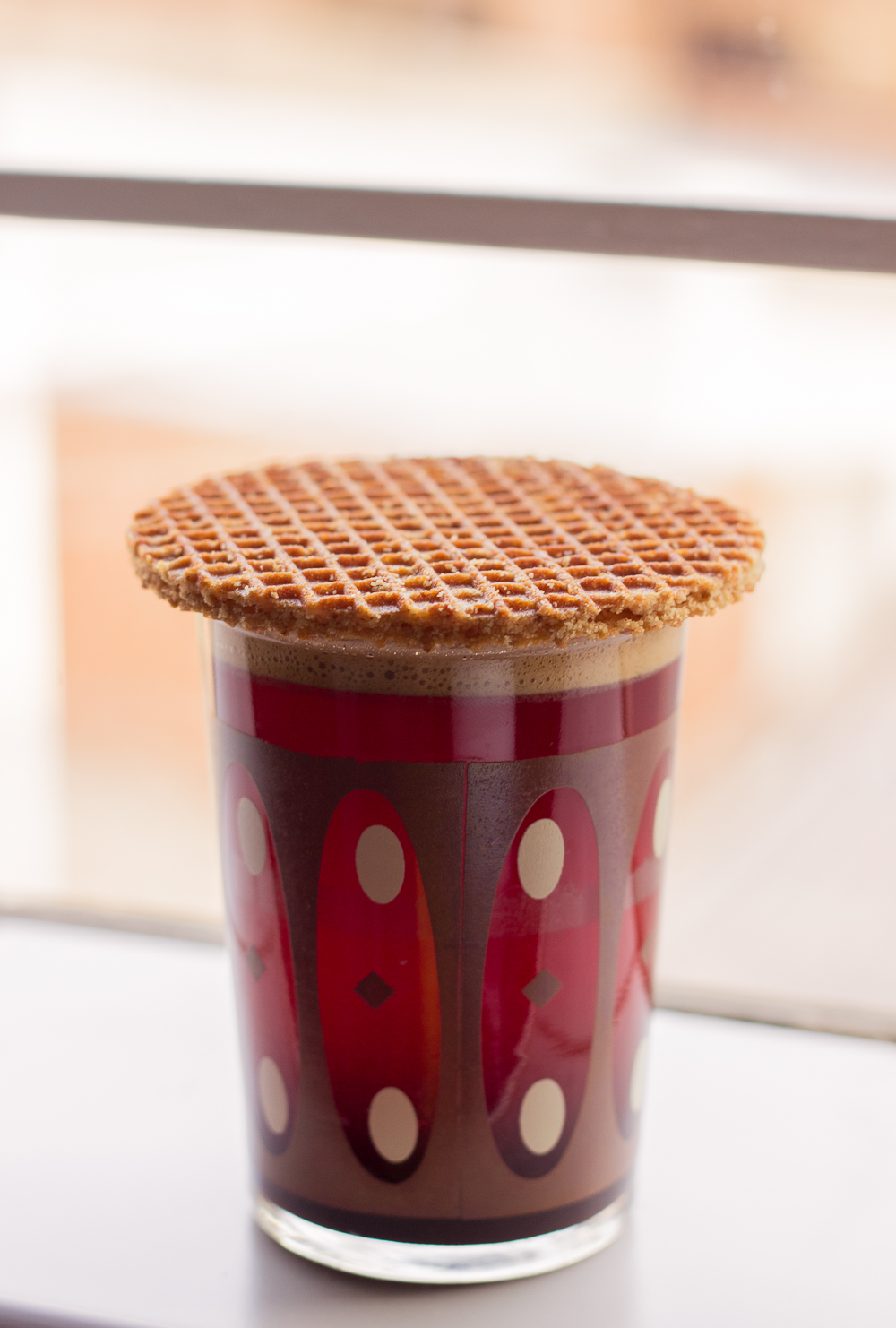
A stroopwafel is placed over a hot drink such as coffee or tea to warm the cookie and soften the syrup.

== See also ==
- Freska – an Egyptian wafer with honey syrup filling
- Lukken – Traditional dessert waffle from West Flanders
- Pizzelle – Italian waffle cookie
- IJzerkoekje – Soft cookie from the Netherlands baked on a checkered iron plate
