= Lo, Belgium =

Lo
- Borough
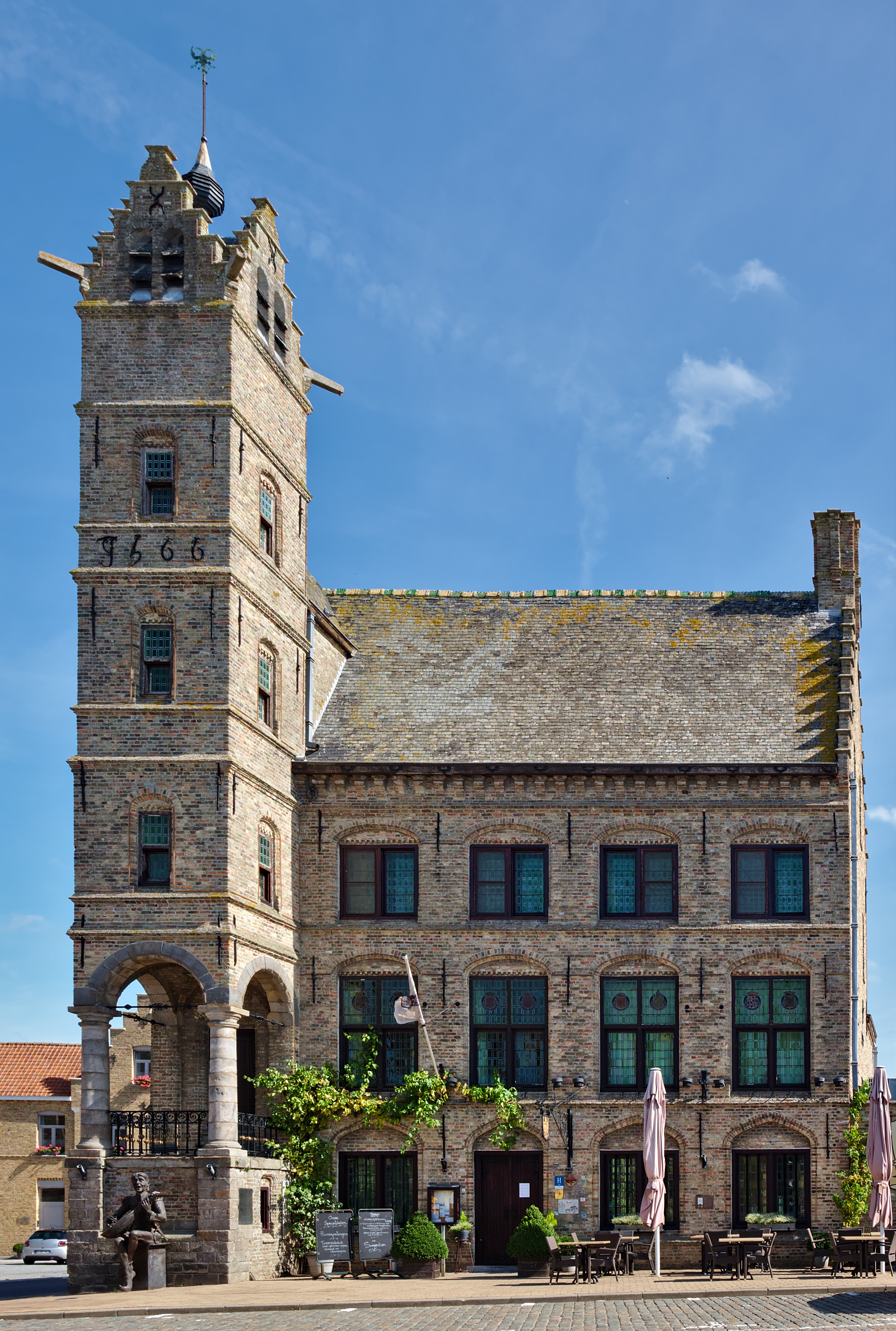
- Old town hall and belfry in Lo

- Coordinates: 50°58′49″N 02°44′54″E
- Country: Belgium
- Province: West Flanders
- Municipality: Lo-Reninge

Area
  - Total: 15.69 km^{2} (6.06 sq mi)

Population (2002)
  - Total: 1,173
  - Density: 75/km^{2} (190/sq mi)
- Source: NIS
- Postal code: 8647

Lo is a small medieval town in the Belgian province of West Flanders in Belgium and a borough of the municipality Lo-Reninge. Lo is part of the community Lo-Reninge, which obtained the city title in 1985. The Old Town Hall of Lo, built between 1565-1566, and its belfry were inscribed on the UNESCO World Heritage List in 1999 as part of the Belfries of Belgium and France site.

Lo is the location of Caesarsboom, an ancient European Yew designated a national monument of Belgium.

== Gallery ==
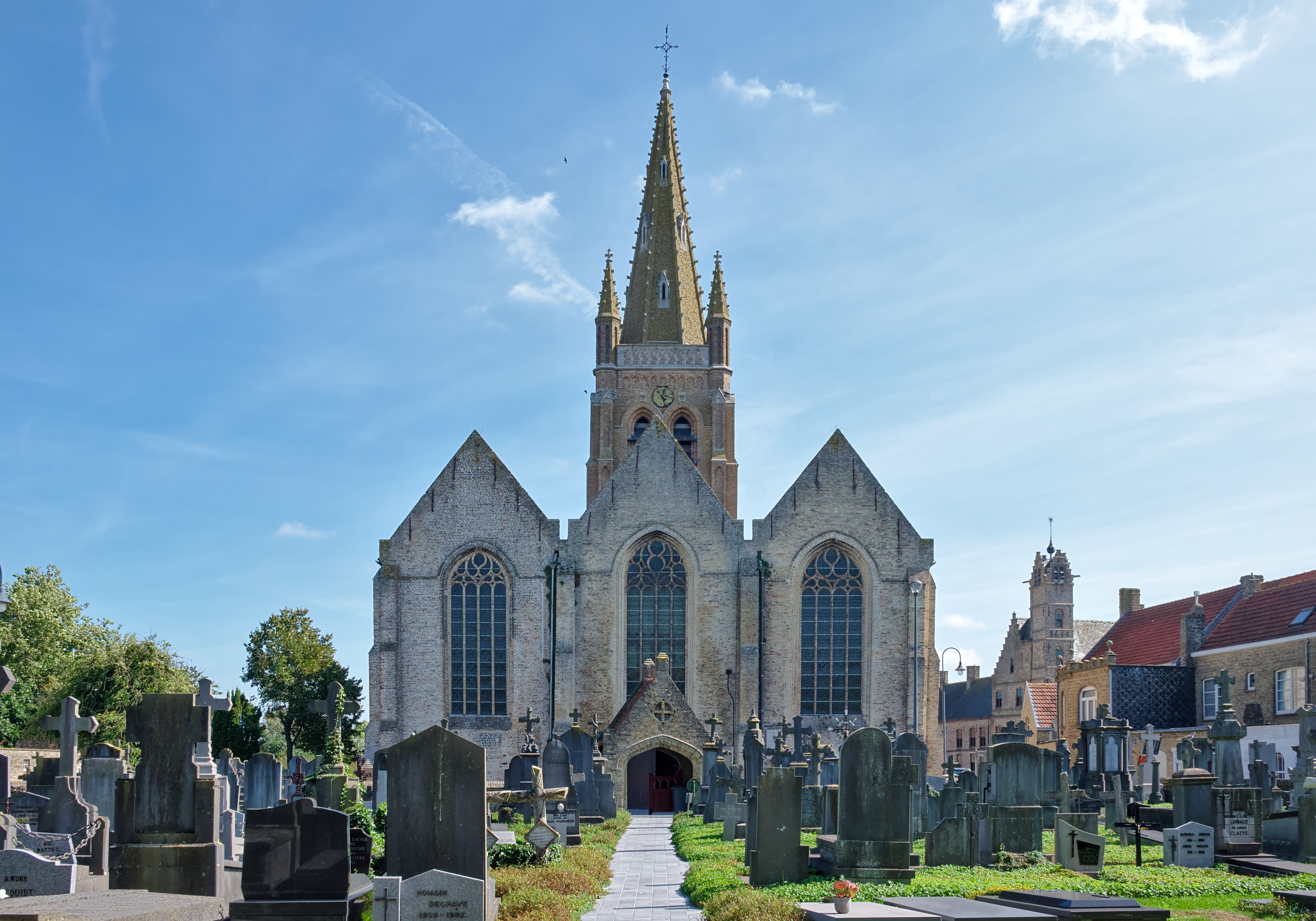
Sint-Pieter's church

== See also ==
- Jules Destrooper
