= Pizzelle =

Italian waffle cookie

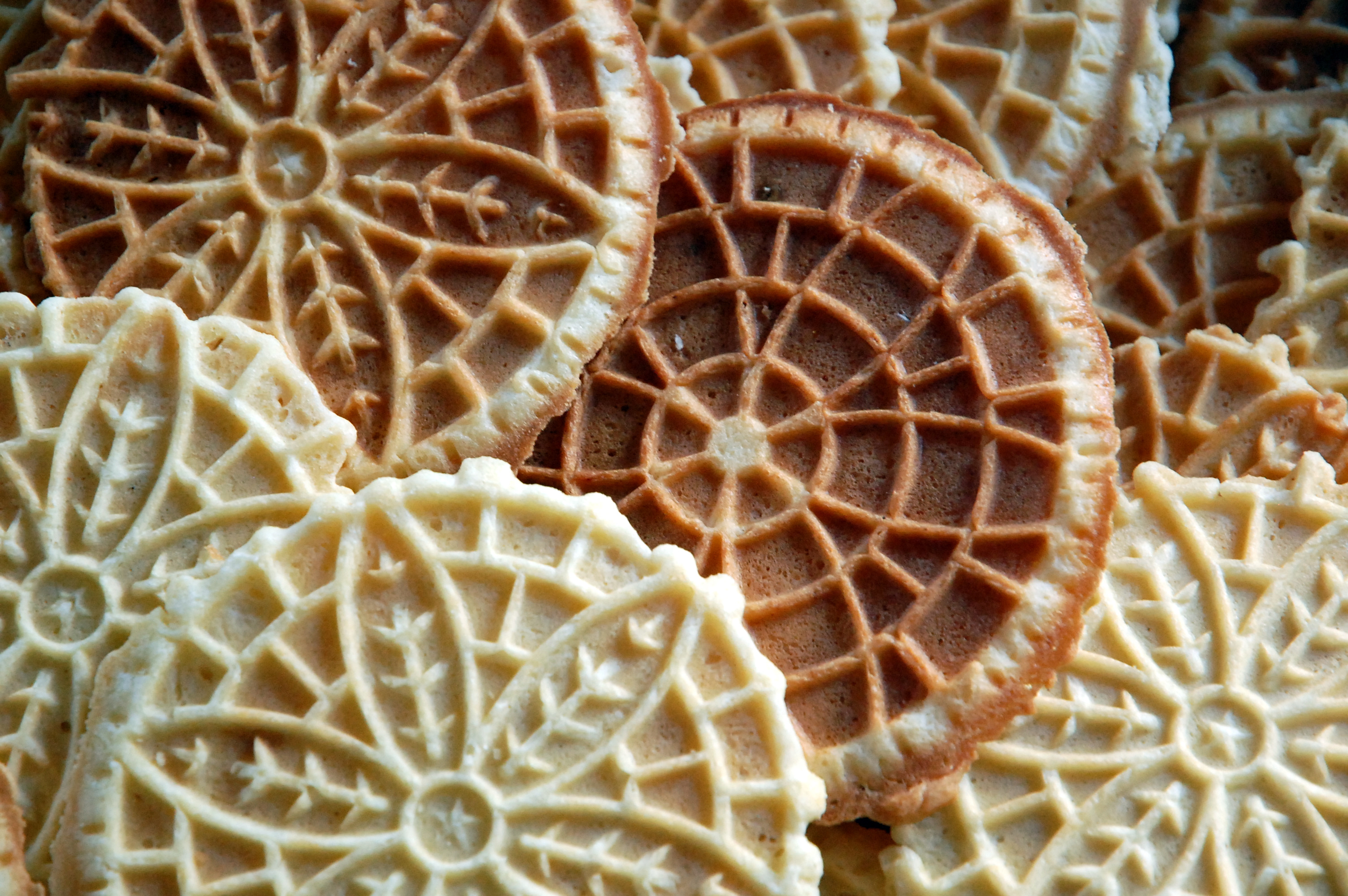
- Alternative names: Ferratelle, nevole, catarrette, cancelle
- Course: Dessert
- Place of origin: Italy
- Region or state: Abruzzo; Lazio; Molise
- Main ingredients: Flour, butter/oil, sugar

Pizzelle (Italian: [pitˈtsɛlle]; sing.: pizzella) are Italian waffle cookies made with flour, eggs, sugar, butter or vegetable oil, and flavoring (usually anise or anisette, or vanilla or lemon zest). Pizzelle are also known as ferratelle, nevole or catarrette in some parts of Abruzzo, as ferratelle in Lazio, and as ferratelle, cancelle or pizzelle in Molise.

Pizzelle are named prodotti agroalimentari tradizionali abruzzesi (traditional agri-food product of Abruzzo) by the Ministry of Agriculture, Food Sovereignty and Forests.

== History ==
Pizzelle are known to be one of the oldest cookies in the world and are thought to have originated from the ancient Roman crustulum. Pizzelle were originally made in the comune (municipality) of Ortona, in the Abruzzo region of Italy, and spread to nearby regions of Molise and Lazio. Many other cultures have developed a pizzelle-type cookie as part of their culture (for example, the Norwegian krumkake).

== Production ==
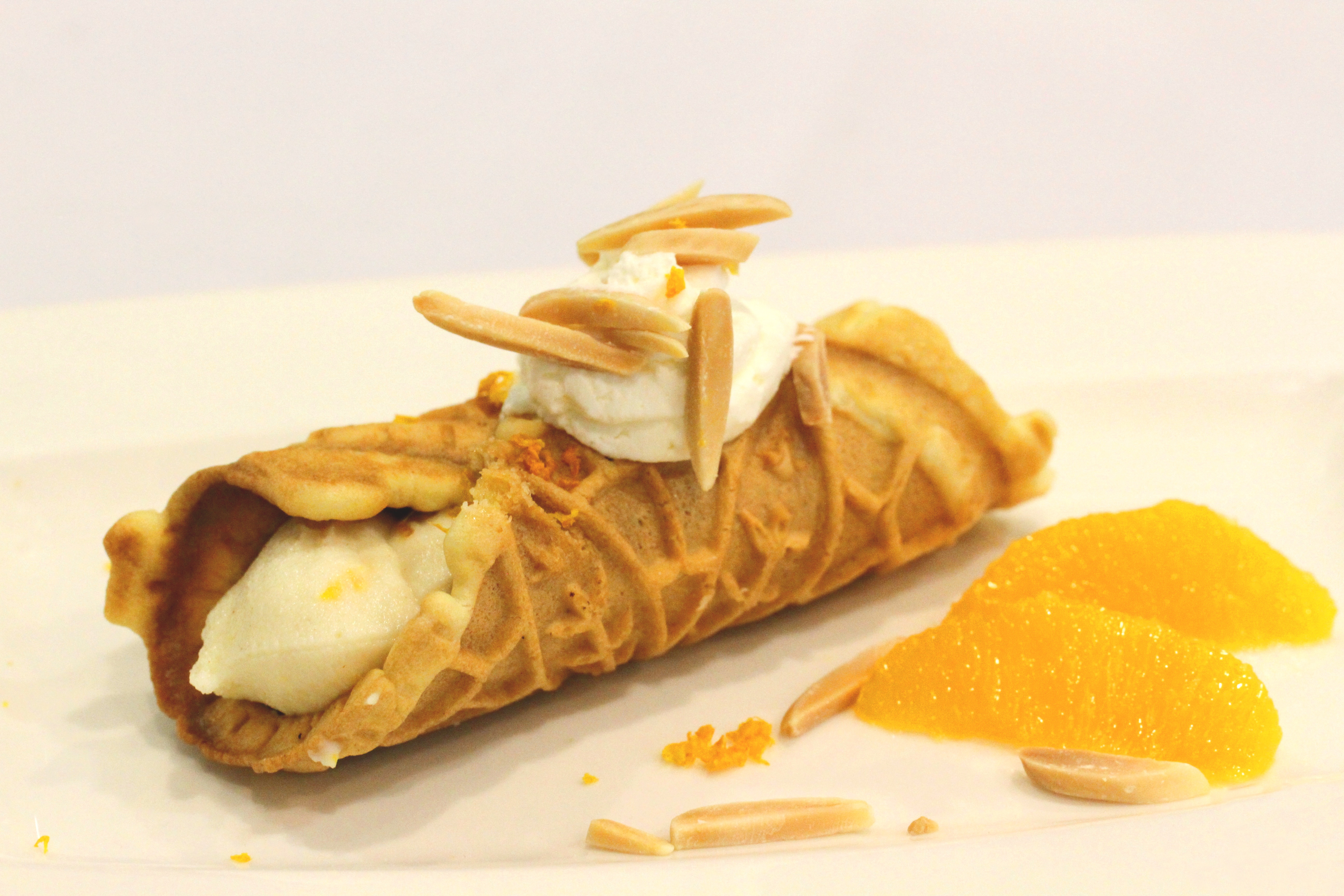
Pizzelle shaped into a cannoli and filled with an orange-almond creme

The cookie dough or batter is put into a pizzelle iron, which resembles a small variant of the popular waffle iron. Originally, the long-handled pizzelle iron was held by hand over a hot burner on the stovetop, although today most pizzelle are made using electric models and require no stove. Typically, the iron stamps a snowflake pattern onto both sides of the thin golden-brown cookie, which has a crisp texture once cooled, although some pizzelle irons feature family crests, special dates, or other decorative designs. Store-bought pizzelle are now commonly available in Italy, and other areas with a large Italian population.

It is also common to sandwich two pizzelle with cannoli cream (ricotta blended with sugar) or hazelnut spread. Pizzelle, while still warm, can also be rolled into a tubular shape using a wooden dowel to create cannoli shells.

Pizzelle are popular during Christmas and Easter. They are often found at Italian weddings, alongside other traditional pastries such as cannoli and traditional Italian cookies.

== See also ==
Media related to Pizzelle at Wikimedia Commons

- List of Italian desserts and pastries
